This is a list of auxiliaries of the United States Navy. It covers the various types of ships that support the frontline combat vessels of the United States Navy.

Ship status is indicated as either currently active [A] (including ready reserve), inactive [I], or precommissioning [P]. Ships in the inactive category include only ships in the inactive reserve, ships which have been disposed from US service have no listed status. Ships in the precommissioning category include ships under construction or on order.

Crane Ships (AB)
USS Kearsarge (AB-1), ex-BB-5

Colliers (AC)

 USS Hannibal (1898)
 USS Justin (1898)
 USS Leonidas (1898)
 USS Marcellus (1879)
 USS Merrimac (1898)
 USS Quincy (1918)
 USS Saturn (1898)
 USS Southery (1898)
 USS Sterling (1898)
 USS Vestal (AC-1), later AR-4
 USS Ontario (AC-2), later AR-3
 USS Jupiter (AC-3), later CV-1, AV-3
 USS Cyclops (AC-4), lost March 1918, 306 killed
 USS Vulcan (AC-5)
 USS Mars (AC-6)
 USS Hector (AC-7)
 USS Neptune (AC-8)
 USS Proteus (AC-9)
 USS Nereus (AC-10)
 USS Orion (AC-11)
 USS Jason (AC-12), later AV-2
 USS Abarenda (AC-13), later AG-14
 USS Ajax (AC-14), later AG-15
 USS Brutus (AC-15)
 USS Caesar (AC-16)
 USS Nero (AC-17)

Auxiliary Minelayers (ACM)

Auxiliary Crane Ships (T-ACS)

  [A]
  [A]
 

Gopher State-class

  [A]
 
  [A]

Other classes

  [I]
 
  [I]
 , later X-Band Transportable Radar Ship (XTR-1)  SS Pacific Tracker

Auxiliary Aircraft Carriers (ACV)

The Auxiliary aircraft carriers (ACV) were redesignated Escort aircraft carriers (CVE).

Destroyer Tenders (AD)

 USS Dixie (AD-1)
 USS Melville (AD-2)
 USS Dobbin (AD-3)
 USS Whitney (AD-4)
 USS Prairie (AD-5)
 USS Panther (AD-6)
 USS Leonidas (AD-7)
 USS Buffalo (AD-8)
 USS Black Hawk (AD-9)
 USS Bridgeport (AD-10), ex-AR-2

Altair-class

 USS Altair (AD-11)
 USS Denebola (AD-12)
 USS Rigel (AD-13)

Dixie-class

 USS Dixie (AD-14)
 USS Prairie (AD-15)
 USS Piedmont (AD-17)
 USS Sierra (AD-18)
 USS Yosemite (AD-19)

Cascade-class
 USS Cascade (AD-16)

Hamul-class

 USS Hamul (AD-20)
 USS Markab (AD-21)

Klondike-class

 USS Klondike (AD-22)
 USS Arcadia (AD-23)
 USS Everglades (AD-24)
 USS Frontier (AD-25)

Shenandoah-class

 USS Shenandoah (AD-26)
 USS Yellowstone (AD-27)
 USS Grand Canyon (AD-28)
 USS Isle Royale (AD-29)
 USS Great Lakes (AD-30)
 USS Tidewater (AD-31)
 USS New England (AD-32)
 USS Canopus (AD-33)
 USS Arrowhead (AD-35), canceled
 USS Bryce Canyon (AD-36)

Alcor-class
 USS Alcor (AD-34), ex-AG-34

Samuel Gompers-class

 USS Samuel Gompers (AD-37)
 USS Puget Sound (AD-38)

Yellowstone-class

 USS Yellowstone (AD-41)
 USS Acadia (AD-42)
 USS Cape Cod (AD-43)
 USS Shenandoah (AD-44)
 (AD-45) - canceled unnamed

Degaussing Ships (ADG)

Ammunition Ships (AE)

 USS Pyro (AE-1)
 USS Nitro (AE-2)
 Major General Henry Gibbins (AE-7), ex-ID-3661, ex-AK-33, not commissioned
 USS Sangay (AE-10)

Lassen-class

 USS Lassen (AE-3)
 USS Mount Baker (AE-4)
 USS Rainier (AE-5)
 USS Shasta (AE-6)
 USS Mauna Loa (AE-8)
 USS Mazama (AE-9)

Mount Hood-class

 USS Mount Hood (AE-11), exploded on 10 November 1944, 372 killed on multiple vessels
 USS Wrangell (AE-12)
 USS Akutan (AE-13)
 USS Firedrake (AE-14)
 USS Vesuvius (AE-15)
 USS Mount Katmai (AE-16)
 USS Great Sitkin (AE-17)
 USS Paricutin (AE-18)
 USS Diamond Head (AE-19)

Fomalhaut-class
 USS Fomalhaut (AE-20), ex-AKA-5

Suribachi-class

 USS Suribachi (AE-21)
 USS Mauna Kea (AE-22)

Nitro-class

 USS Nitro (AE-23)
 USS Pyro (AE-24)
 USS Haleakala (AE-25)

Andromeda-class

 USS Virgo (AE-30), ex-AKA-20
 USS Chara (AE-31), ex-AKA-58

Kilauea-class

 USS Kilauea (AE-26)
 USS Butte (AE-27)
 USS Santa Barbara (AE-28)
 USS Mount Hood (AE-29)
 USS Flint (AE-32)
 USS Shasta (AE-33)
 USS Mount Baker (AE-34)
 USS Kiska (AE-35)

Auxiliary floating drydock

Large Auxiliary Repair Docks (ABSD)
Reclassified as Large Auxiliary Floating Dry Docks (AFDB) in August 1946.

 USS Artisan (ABSD-1)
 USS ABSD-2
 USS ABSD-3
 USS ABSD-4
 USS ABSD-5
 USS ABSD-6
 USS ABSD-7
 USS ABSD-8
 USS ABSD-9
 USS ABSD-10

Large Auxiliary Floating Dry Docks (AFDB)

 USS Artisan (AFDB-1)
 USS AFDB-2
 USS AFDB-3
 USS AFDB-4
 USS AFDB-5
 USS AFDB-6
 
 USS Machinist (AFDB-8)
 USS AFDB-9

Small Auxiliary Floating Dry Docks (AFDL)

 USS Endeavor (AFDL-1)
 USS AFDL-2
 USS AFDL-3
 USS AFDL-4
 USS AFDL-5
 USS Dynamic (AFDL-6)
 USS Ability (AFDL-7)
 USS AFDL-8
 USS AFDL-9
 USS AFDL-10
 USS AFDL-11
 USS AFDL-12
 USS AFDL-13
 USS AFDL-14
 USS AFDL-15
 USS AFDL-16
 USS AFDL-17
 USS AFDL-18
 USS AFDL-19
 USS AFDL-20
 USS AFDL-21
 USS AFDL-22
 USS Adept (AFDL-23)
 USS AFDL-24
 USS Undaunted (AFDL-25)
 USS AFDL-26
 USS AFDL-27
 USS AFDL-28
 USS AFDL-29
 USS AFDL-30
 USS AFDL-31
 USS AFDL-32
 USS AFDL-33
 USS AFDL-34
 USS AFDL-35
 USS AFDL-36
 USS AFDL-37
 USS AFDL-38
 USS AFDL-39
 USS AFDL-40
 USS AFDL-41
 USS AFDL-42
 USS AFDL-43
 USS AFDL-44
 USS AFDL-45
 USS AFDL-46
 USS Reliance (AFDL-47)
 USS Diligence (AFDL-48)

Medium Auxiliary Floating Dry Docks (AFDM)

All AFDMs were classified as YFDs until 1945.

 USS AFDM-1
 USS AFDM-2
 USS AFDM-3
 USS AFDM-4
 USS Resourceful (AFDM-5)
 USS Competent (AFDM-6)
 USS Sustain (AFDM-7)
 USS Richland (AFDM-8)
 USS AFDM-9
 USS Resolute (AFDM-10) [I]
 USS AFDM-11
 USS AFDM-12
 USS AFDM-13
 USS Steadfast (AFDM-14)

Auxiliary Repair Docks (ARD)

 USS ARD-1
 USS ARD-2
 USS ARD-3
 USS ARD-4
 USS Waterford (ARD-5)
 USS ARD-6
 USS West Milton (ARD-7)
 USS ARD-8
 USS ARD-9
 USS ARD-10
 USS ARD-11
 USS ARD-12
 USS ARD-13
 USS ARD-14
 USS ARD-15
 USS ARD-16
 USS ARD-17
 USS ARD-18
 USS ARD-19
 USS White Sands (ARD-20), later T-AGDS-1
 USS ARD-21
 USS Windsor (ARD-22)
 USS ARD-23
 USS ARD-24
 USS ARD-25
 USS ARD-26
 USS ARD-27
 USS ARD-28
 USS Arco (ARD-29)
 USS San Onofre (ARD-30)
 USS ARD-31
 USS ARD-32
 USS ARD-33

Medium Auxiliary Repair Docks (ARDM)

 USS Oak Ridge (ARDM-1)
 USS Alamogordo (ARDM-2)
 USS Endurance (ARDM-3)
 Shippingport (ARDM-4) [A]
 Arco (ARDM-5) [A]

Yard Floating Drydocks (YFD) 

All YFDs were reclassified as AFDMs in 1945.

Provisions Store Ships (AF, T-AF)

 USS Bridge (AF-1)
 USS Celtic (AF-2)
 USS Culgoa (AF-3)
 USS Glacier (AF-4)
 USS Pompey (AF-5)
 USS Rappahannock (AF-6), ex-ID-1854
 USS Arctic (AF-7), ex-ID-3806
 USS Boras (AF-8)
 USS Yukon (AF-9)
 USS Aldebaran (AF-10)
 USS Polaris (AF-11)
 USS Mizar (AF-12)
 USS Tarazed (AF-13)
 USS Uranus (AF-14)
 USS Talamanca (AF-15)
 USS Pastores (AF-16), ex-ID-4540
 USS Antigua (AF-17)
 USS Calamares (AF-18), ex-ID-3662
 USS Roamer (AF-19)
 USS Pontiac (AF-20)
 USS Merak (AF-21)
 USS Ariel (AF-22)
 USS Cygnus (AF-23)
 USS Delphinus (AF-24)
 USS Taurus (AF-25)
 USS Octans (AF-26)
 USS Pictor (AF-27)
 USS Hyades (AF-28)
 USS Graffias (AF-29)
 USS Adria (AF-30)
 USS Arequipa (AF-31)
 USS Corduba (AF-32)
 USS Karin (AF-33)
 USS Kerstin (AF-34)
 USS Latona (AF-35)
 USS Lioba (AF-36)
 USS Malabar (AF-37)
 USS Merapi (AF-38)
 USS Palisana (AF-39)
 USS Saturn (AF-40)
 USS Athanasia (AF-41)
 USS Bondia (AF-42)
 USS Gordonia (AF-43)
 USS Laurentia (AF-44)
 USS Lucidor (AF-45)
 USS Octavia (AF-46)
 USS Valentine (AF-47)
 USS Alstede (AF-48)
 USS Zelima (AF-49)
 USNS Bald Eagle (T-AF-50)
 USNS Blue Jacket (T-AF-51)
 USNS Golden Eagle (T-AF-52)
 USNS Grommet Reefer (T-AF-53)
 USS Pictor (AF-54)
 USS Aludra (AF-55)
 USS Denebola (AF-56)
 USS Regulus (AF-57)
 USS Rigel (AF-58)
 USS Vega (AF-59)
 USS Sirius (AF-60)
 USS Procyon (AF-61)
 USS Bellatrix (AF-62)
 USNS Asterion (T-AF-63)
 USNS Perseus (T-AF-64)

Combat Stores Ships (AFS, T-AFS)

Mars-class combat stores ships

 USS Mars (AFS-1)
 USS Sylvania (AFS-2)
 USS Niagara Falls (AFS-3)
 USS White Plains (AFS-4)
 USS Concord (AFS-5)
 USS San Diego (AFS-6)
 USS San Jose (AFS-7)

Sirius-class combat stores ships

 USNS Sirius (T-AFS-8)
 USNS Spica (T-AFS-9)
 USNS Saturn (T-AFS-10)

Miscellaneous Ships (AG, T-AG)
For similar lists of 'miscellaneous' ships see 
List of unclassified miscellaneous vessels of the United States Navy (IX) 
and 

 USS Hannibal (AG-1), survey ship
 USS Lebanon (AG-2), collier, supply ship, target tug
 USS Nanshan (AG-3), collier
 USS Saturn (AG-4), collier
 USS General Alava (AG-5), war prize, cargo ship
 USS Dubuque (AG-6), later IX-9, PG-17
 USS Paducah (AG-7), later IX-23, PG-18
 USS Mahanna (AG-8), cargo ship
 USS Great Northern (AG-9), transport
 USS Antares (AG-10), later AKS-3
 USS Procyon (AG-11), later IX-38
 USS Gold Star (AG-12), ex-AK-12
 USS Pensacola (AG-13), ex-AK-7
 USS Abarenda (AG-14), ex-AC-13
 USS Ajax (AG-15), seaplane tender, ex-AC-14
 USS Utah (AG-16), target ship, ex-BB-31, sunk Pearl Harbor 7 December 1941, 58 killed
 USS Wyoming (AG-17), training ship, ex-BB-32
 USS Stoddert (AG-18), target ship, ex- and later DD-302
 USS Boggs (AG-19), ex-DD-136, later and ex-DMS-3
 USS Kilty (AG-20), ex- and later DD-137, later APD-15
 USS Lamberton (AG-21), ex-DD-119, later and ex-DMS-2
 USS Radford (AG-22), target ship, ex- and later DD-120
 USS Sequoia (AG-23), presidential yacht
 USS Semmes (AG-24), electronics test ship, ex-DD-189
 USS Potomac (AG-25), presidential yacht
 USS Cuyahoga (AG-26), presidential yacht tender, ex-WSC-157, later WIX-157
 USS Robert L. Barnes (AG-27), ex-AO-14, captured Guam December 1941
 USS Manley (AG-28), ex-DD-74, later APD-1, DD-74
 USS Bear (AG-29), ex-polar research ship
 USS Bowditch (AG-30), survey ship, later AGS-4
 USS Argonne (AG-31), flagship, ex-AP-4, AS-10
 USS Sumner (AG-32), survey ship, ex-AS-2, later AGS-5
 USS Kaula (AG-33), SeaBee cargo ship
 USS Alcor (AG-34), later AR-10, AD-34
 USS Calypso (AG-35), presidential yacht tender, ex-WPC-104
 USS Manasquan (AG-36), weather ship, ex-ID-3568
 USS Manomet (AG-37), ex-ID-4215B, later AK-51
 USS Mantinicus (AG-38), later AK-52, AP-75
 USS Menemsha (AG-39), weather ship, later WAG-274
 USS Monomoy (AG-40), weather ship, later WAG-275
 USS Midway (AG-41), cargo ship
 USS Camanga (AG-42), cargo ship, ex-ID-3496
 USS Majaba (AG-43), cargo ship, later IX-102
 USS Malanao (AG-44), cargo ship
 USS Taganak (AG-45), cargo ship, ex-ID-1792
 USS Tuluran (AG-46), cargo ship, ex-ID-2995
 USS Manhasset (AG-47), weather ship, ex-YAG-8, later WIX-276
 USS Muskeget (AG-48), weather ship, ex-YAG-9, later WAG-48, sunk 9 September 1942 by U-755
 USS Anacapa (AG-49), Q-ship (decoy)
 USS Kopara (AG-50), ex-AK-62
 USS Besboro (AG-66), cargo ship
 USS Antaeus (AG-67), ex-AS-21, later AH-18
 USS Basilan (AG-68), later ARG-12
 USS Burias (AG-69), later ARG-13
 USS Zaniah (AG-70), stores-barracks-distilling-repair ship, ex-AK-120
 USS Baham (AG-71), stores-barracks-distilling-repair ship, ex-AK-122
 USS Parris Island (AG-72), ex-PCE–901
 USS Belle Isle (AG-73), electronics repair ship, later AKS-21
 USS Coasters Harbor (AG-74), electronics repair ship, later AKS-22
 USS Cuttyhunk Island (AG-75), transport, later AKS-23
 USS Avery Island (AG-76), transport, later AKS-24
 USS Indian Island (AG-77), transport, later AKS-25
 USS Kent Island (AG-78), transport, later AKS-26
 USS Wright (AG-79)/USS San Clemente (AG-79), flagship, ex-AZ-1, AV-1
 USS Du Pont (AG-80), target ship, ex-DD-152
 USS J. Fred Talbott (AG-81), target ship, ex-DD-156
 USS Schenck (AG-82), target ship, ex-DD-159
 USS Kennison (AG-83), target ship, ex-DD-138
 USS Hatfield (AG-84), target tow, ex-DD-231
 USS Fox (AG-85), target ship, ex-DD-234
 USS Bulmer (AG-86), target ship, ex-DD-222
 USS MacLeish (AG-87), target ship, ex-DD-220
 USS Burton Island (AG-88), later AGB-1
 USS Edisto (AG-89), later AGB-2
 USS Atka (AG-90), later AGB-3
 USS Dahlgren (AG-91), mine warfare test ship, ex-DD-187
 USS Gwinnett (AG-92), ex-AK-185, later AVS-5
 USS Nicollet (AG-93), ex-AK-199, later AVS-6
 USS Pontotoc (AG-94), ex-AK-206, later AVS-7
 USS Litchfield (AG-95), ex-DD-336
 USS Broome (AG-96), ex-DD-210
 USS Simpson (AG-97), target tow, ex-DD-221
 USS Ramsay (AG-98), training carrier plane guard, ex-DD-124, DM-16
 USS Preble (AG-99), plane guard, ex-DD-345, DM-20
 USS Sicard (AG-100), target ship, ex-DD-346, DM-21
 USS Pruitt (AG-101), target ship, ex-DD-347, DM-22
 USS Babbitt (AG-102), experimental sonar ship, ex-DD-128
 USS Upshur (AG-103), plane guard, ex-DD-144, DM-20
 USS Elliot (AG-104), target tow, ex-DD-146, DMS-4
 USS Hogan (AG-105), target ship, ex-DD-178, DMS-6
 USS Howard (AG-106), plane guard, ex-DD-179, DMS-7
 USS Stansbury (AG-107), training ship, ex-DD-180, DMS-8
 USS Chandler (AG-108), target tow, ex-DD-206, DMS-9
 USS Zane (AG-109), target tow, ex-DD-337, DMS-14
 USS Trever (AG-110), ex-DD-339, DMS-16
 USS Hamilton (AG-111), mine warfare test ship, ex-DD-141, DMS-18
 USS Breckinridge (AG-112), plane guard, ex-DD-148
 USS Barney (AG-113), target ship, ex-DD-149
 USS Biddle (AG-114), ex-DD-151
 USS Ellis (AG-115), plane guard, ex-DD-154
 USS Cole (AG-116), plane guard, ex-DD-155
 USS Whipple (AG-117), target ship, ex-DD-217
 USS McCormick (AG-118), ex-DD-223
 USS John D. Ford (AG-119), plane guard, ex-DD-228
 USS Paul Jones (AG-120), ex-DD-230
 USS Humboldt (AG-121), press information ship, ex- and later AVP-21
 USS Matagorda (AG-122), press information ship, ex- and later AVP-22
 USS Rockaway (AG-123), press information ship, ex- and later AVP-29
 USS Maumee (AG-124), station fuel ship, ex-AO-2
 USS Patoka (AG-125), minecraft tender, ex-AO-9
 USS McDougal (AG-126), experimental radar gunnery ship, ex-DD-358
 USS Winslow (AG-127), experimental antiaircraft ordnance ship, ex-DD-359
 USS Mississippi (AG-128), training ship, ex-BB-41
 USS Whitewood (AG-129), Arctic survey ship, ex-YN-84, AN-63
 USS Camano (AG-130), ex-US Army FS-256, later AKL-1
 USS Deal (AG-131), ex-USA FS-263, later AKL-2
 USS Elba (AG-132), ex-USA FS-267, later AKL-3
 USS Errol (AG-133), ex-USA FS-274, later AKL-4
 USS Estero (AG-134), ex-USA FS-275, later AKL-5
 USS Jekyl (AG-135), ex-USA FS-282, later AKL-6
 USS Metomkin (AG-136), ex-USA FS-316, later AKL-7
 USS Roque (AG-137), ex-USA FS-347, later AKL-8
 USS Ryer (AG-138), ex-USA FS-361, later AKL-9
 USS Sharps (AG-139), ex-USA FS-385, later AKL-10
 USS Whidbey (AG-141), clinic, medical survey vessel, epidemiological disease control ship, ex-USA FS-395
 USS Nashawena (AG-142), cable layer, ex-USA BSP-2098 barge, later YAG-35
 USS Mark (AG-143), ex-USA FS-214, later AKL-12
 USS Hewell (AG-145), ex-USA FS-391, later AKL-14
 USS Electron (AG-146), electronics parts issue ship, ex-LST-1070, later AKS-27
 USS Proton (AG-147), electronics parts issue ship, ex-LST-1078, later AKS-28
 USS Colington (AG-148), stores issue ship, ex-LST-1085, later AKS-29
 USS League Island (AG-149), stores issue ship, ex-LST-1097, later AKS-30
 USS Chimon (AG-150), stores issue ship, ex-LST-1102, later AKS-31
 USS Richard E. Kraus (AG-151), experimental electronics ship, ex- and later DD-849
 USS Timmerman (AG-152), experimental ship (engines and superstructure), ex-DD-828, EDD-828
 USS Compass Island (E-AG-153), inertial navigation test ship
 USS Observation Island (EAG-154), Polaris missile test ship, later T-AGM-23
 USS King County (AG-157), Regulus II missile test ship, ex-LST-857
 USS Glover (AG-158)
 USS Oxford (AG-159), SIGINT ship, later AGTR-1
 USNS Range Tracker (T-AG-160), missile range tracking ship, later T-AGM-1
 USNS Range Recoverer (T-AG-161), missile range tracking ship, ex-USA FS-278, later T-AGM-2, YFRT-524
 USNS Mission Capistrano (T-AG-162), sonar test ship, ex-T‑AO‑112
 USS Glover (AG-163)
 USNS Kingsport (T-AG-164), satellite communication ship, ex-T-AK-239
 USS Georgetown (AG-165), SIGINT ship, later AGTR-2
 USS Jamestown (AG-166), SIGINT ship, later AGTR-3
 USS Belmont (AG-167), SIGINT ship, later AGTR-4
 USS Liberty (AG-168), SIGINT ship, later AGTR-5
 USNS Pvt. Jose F. Valdez (T-AG-169) SIGINT ship, ex-APc-119
 USNS LT. James E. Robinson (T-AG-170), cable transport ship, ex-T-AKV-3, later T-AK-274
 USNS Sgt. Joseph E. Muller (T-AG-171), SIGINT ship
 USNS Phoenix (T-AG-172), depot ship
 USNS Provo (T-AG-173), depot ship
 USNS Cheyenne (T-AG-174), depot ship
 USNS Sgt. Curtis F. Shoup (T-AG-175), survey ship
 USS Peregrine (AG-176), experimental mine warfare ship, ex-AM-373, MSF-373
 USNS Shearwater (T-AG-177), survey support ship, ex-USA FS-411
 USNS Flyer (T-AG-178), SOSUS survey ship
 USNS Havenford (T-AG-179), depot ship, canceled
 USNS Antioch (T-AG-180), depot ship, canceled
 USNS Adelphi (T-AG-181), depot ship, canceled
 USNS Lynn (T-AG-182), depot ship, canceled
 USNS Clarksburg (T-AG-183), depot ship, canceled
 USNS Clemson (T-AG-184), cargo ship, canceled
 USNS Carthage (T-AG-185), cargo ship, canceled, museum ship
 USNS Bessemer (T-AG-186), depot ship, canceled
 USNS Milford (T-AG-187), depot ship, canceled
 USNS Rollins (T-AG-189), depot ship, canceled
 USS Spokane (T-AG-191), sonar test ship, ex-CL-120
 USNS S P Lee (T-AG-192), acoustics research ship, ex-T-AGS-31
 USNS Glomar Explorer (T-AG-193), deep-sea drillship
 USNS Vanguard (T-AG-194), missile range tracking ship, ex-T-AO-122, later T-AGM-19
 USNS Hayes (T-AG-195), acoustics research ship, ex-T-AGOR-16 [I]
 USS Hunting (E-AG-398), sonar research ship, ex-LSM-398
 USS Alacrity (AG-520), ex-AM-520, MSO-520
 USS Assurance (AG-521), ex-AM-521, MSO-521
 USNS Vice Adm. K. R. Wheeler (T-AG-5001) [A], Offshore Petroleum Distribution System (OPDS) ship

Icebreakers (AGB)

 USS Burton Island (AGB-1), ex-AG-88, later WAGB-283
 USS Edisto (AGB-2), ex-AG-89, later WAGB-284
 USS Atka (AGB-3), ex-AG-90, later WAGB-280
 USS Glacier (AGB-4), later WAGB-4
 USS Staten Island (AGB-5), later WAGB-278

Amphibious Force Command Ships (AGC)

Deep Submergence Support Ship (T-AGDS)
 USNS White Sands (T-AGDS-1), ex-ARD-20
 USNS Point Loma (T-AGDS-2), ex-AKD-1

Hydrofoil Research Ship (AGEH)

 USS Plainview (AGEH-1)

Environmental Research Ships (AGER)
Signals intelligence collection vessels.

Banner-class

 USS Banner (AGER-1), ex-AKL-25
 USS Pueblo (AGER-2) [I], ex-AKL-44, captured by North Korea 23 January 1968, 1 killed, still in commission
 USS Palm Beach (AGER-3), ex-AKL-45

Command Ships (AGF)
 USS Valcour (AGF-1), ex-AVP-55
 USS La Salle (AGF-3), ex-LPD-3
 USS Coronado (AGF-11), ex-LPD-11

Missile Range Instrumentation Ships (T-AGM)

 USNS Range Tracker (T-AGM-1)
 USNS Range Recoverer (T-AGM-2)
 USNS Longview (T-AGM-3)
 USNS Richfield (T-AGM-4)
 USNS Sunnyvale (T-AGM-5)
 USNS Watertown (T-AGM-6)
 USNS Huntsville (T-AGM-7)
 USNS Wheeling (T-AGM-8)
 USNS General H. H. Arnold (T-AGM-9), ex-AP-139
 USNS General Hoyt S. Vandenberg (T-AGM-10), ex-AP-145
 USNS Twin Falls (T-AGM-11), later T-AGS-37
 USNS American Mariner (T-AGM-12)
 USNS Sword Knot (T-AGM-13)
 USNS Rose Knot (T-AGM-14)
 USNS Coastal Sentry (T-AGM-15)
 USNS Coastal Crusader (T-AGM-16), ex-AK-220, later AGS-36
 USNS Timber Hitch (T-AGM-17)
 USNS Sampan Hitch (T-AGM-18)
 USNS Vanguard (T-AGM-19)
 USNS Redstone (T-AGM-20)
 USNS Mercury (T-AGM-21)
 USNS Range Sentinel (T-AGM-22)
 USNS Observation Island (T-AGM-23)
 USNS Invincible (T-AGM-24) [I]
 USNS Howard O. Lorenzen (T-AGM-25) [A]

Major Communications Relay Ships (AGMR)
 USS Annapolis (AGMR-1), ex-CVE-107
 USS Arlington (AGMR-2), ex-CVL-48, ex-CC-3

Oceanographic Research Ships (T-AGOR)

 USNS Josiah Willard Gibbs (T-AGOR-1), former AVP-51
 T-AGOR-2 built for Norway
Robert D. Conrad-class

 USNS Robert D. Conrad (T-AGOR-3)
 USNS James M. Gilliss (T-AGOR-4)
 USNS Charles H. Davis (T-AGOR-5)
 USNS Sands (T-AGOR-6)
 USNS Lynch (T-AGOR-7)
 USNS Thomas G. Thompson (T-AGOR-9)
 USNS Thomas Washington (T-AGOR-10)
 USNS De Steiguer (T-AGOR-12)
 USNS Bartlett (T-AGOR-13)

Eltanin-class
 USNS Eltanin (T-AGOR-8), ex-T-AK-270
 USNS Mizar (T-AGOR-11), ex-T-AK-272

Melville-class
 USNS Melville (T-AGOR-14)
 USNS Knorr (T-AGOR-15)

Hayes-class
 USNS Hayes (T-AGOR-16), later T-AG-195

Diver-class
 USNS Chain (T-AGOR-17), former ARS-20
 USNS Snatch (T-AGOR-18), former ARS-27

Gyre-class
 USNS Gyre (T-AGOR-21)
 USNS Moana Wave (T-AGOR-22)

Thomas G. Thompson-class
 USNS Thomas G. Thompson (T-AGOR-23) [A]
 USNS Roger Revelle (T-AGOR-24) [A]
 USNS Atlantis (T-AGOR-25) [A]

Kilo Moana-class
 USNS Kilo Moana (T-AGOR-26) [A]

Neil Armstrong-class
  [A]
  [A]

Ocean Surveillance Ships (T-AGOS)
Stalwart-class

 USNS Stalwart (T-AGOS-1)
 USNS Contender (T-AGOS-2)
 USNS Vindicator (T-AGOS-3)
 USNS Triumph (T-AGOS-4)
 USNS Assurance (T-AGOS-5)
 USNS Persistent (T-AGOS-6)
 USNS Indomitable (T-AGOS-7)
 USNS Prevail (T-AGOS-8)
 USNS Assertive (T-AGOS-9)
 USNS Invincible (T-AGOS-10)
 USNS Audacious (T-AGOS-11)
 USNS Bold (T-AGOS-12)
 USNS Adventurous (T-AGOS-13)
 USNS Worthy (T-AGOS-14)
 USNS Titan (T-AGOS-15)
 USNS Capable (T-AGOS-16)
 USNS Tenacious (T-AGOS-17)
 USNS Relentless (T-AGOS-18)

Victorious-class

 USNS Victorious (T-AGOS-19) [A]
 USNS Able (T-AGOS-20) [A]
 USNS Effective (T-AGOS-21) [A]
 USNS Loyal (T-AGOS-22) [A]

Impeccable-class
 USNS Impeccable (T-AGOS-23) [A]

Motor Torpedo Boat Tenders (AGP)

 USS Niagara (AGP-1), ex-CMc-2, PG-52, sunk by air attack Tulagi 23 May 1943, no fatalities
 USS Hilo (AGP-2), ex-PG-58
 USS Jamestown (AGP-3), ex-PG-55
 USS Portunus (AGP-4), ex-LST-330
 USS Varuna (AGP-5), ex-LST-14
 USS Oyster Bay (AGP-6), ex-AVP-28, later AVP-28
 USS Mobjack (AGP-7), ex-AVP-27
 USS Wachapreague (AGP-8), ex-AVP-56
 USS Willoughby (AGP-9), ex-AVP-57
 USS Orestes (AGP-10), ex-LST-135
 USS Silenus (AGP-11), ex-LST-604
 USS Acontius (AGP-12)
 USS Cyrene (AGP-13)
 USS Alecto (AGP-14). ex-LST-977
 USS Callisto (AGP-15), ex-LST-966
 USS Antigone (AGP-16), ex-LST-773
 USS Brontes (AGP-17), ex-LST-1125
 USS Chiron (AGP-18), ex-LST-1133
 USS Pontus (AGP-20), ex-LST-201
 USS Garrett County (AGP-786), ex-LST-786
 USS Harnett County (AGP-821), ex-LST-821
 USS Hunterdon County (AGP-838), ex-LST-838
 USS Graham County (AGP-1176), ex-LST-1176

Radar Picket Ships (AGR)

Guardian-class radar picket ship

All Guardian-class ships were originally classed as YAGR but were then reclassed as AGR in 1958.

 USS Guardian (AGR-1)
 USS Lookout (AGR-2)
 USS Skywatcher (AGR-3)
 USS Searcher (AGR-4)
 USS Scanner (AGR-5)
 USS Locator (AGR-6)
 USS Picket (AGR-7)
 USS Interceptor (AGR-8)
 USS Investigator (AGR-9)
 USS Outpost (AGR-10)
 USS Protector (AGR-11)
 USS Vigil (AGR-12)
 USS Interdictor (AGR-13)
 USS Interpreter (AGR-14)
 USS Interrupter (AGR-15)
 USS Watchman (AGR-16)

Surveying Ships (AGS)

 USS Pathfinder (AGS-1)
 USS Hydrographer (AGS-2)
 USS Oceanographer (AGS-3), ex-SP-159, ex-PG-85
 USS Bowditch (AGS-4), ex-AG-30
 USS Sumner (AGS-5), ex-AG-32
 USS Derickson (AGS-6)
 USS Littlehales (AGS-7)
 USS Dutton (AGS-8), ex-PCS-1396, later AGSC-8
 USS Amistead Rust (AGS-9)
 USS John Blish (AGS-10), ex-PCS-1457, later AGSC-10
 USS Chauvenet (AGS-11)
 USS Harkness (AGS-12), ex-YMS-242, later AGSC-12
 USS James M. Gilliss (AGS-13), ex-YMS-262, later AGSC-13
 USS Simon Newcomb (AGS-14), ex-YMS-263, later AGSC-14
 USS Tanner (AGS-15), ex-AKA-34
 USS Maury (AGS-16), ex-AKA-36
 USS Pursuit (AGS-17), ex-AM-108
 USS Requisite (AGS-18), ex-AM-109
 USS Sheldrake (AGS-19), ex-AM-62
 USS Prevail (AGS-20), ex-AM-107

Bowditch-class

 USNS Bowditch (T-AGS-21)
 USNS Michelson (T-AGS-23)

Other classes

 USNS Dutton (T-AGS-22)
 USS Seranno (AGS-24)
 USNS Kellar (T-AGS-25)

Silas Bent-class

 USNS Silas Bent (T-AGS-26)
 USNS Kane (T-AGS-27)
 USNS Wilkes (T-AGS-33)
 USNS Wyman (T-AGS-34)

Other classes

 USS Towhee (AGS-28), ex-MSF-388
 USNS Chauvenet (T-AGS-29)
 USS San Pablo (AGS-30), ex-AVP-30
 USNS S. P. Lee (T-AGS-31)
 USNS Harkness (T-AGS-32)
 USNS Sgt. George D. Keathley (T-AGS-35), ex-T-APC-117
 USS Coastal Crusader (AGS-36), ex-AK-220, T-AGM-16
 USNS Twin Falls (T-AGS-37), ex-T-AGM-11
 USNS H. H. Hess (T-AGS-38)
 USNS Maury (T-AGS-39)
 USNS Tanner (T-AGS-40)
 USNS Waters (T-AGS-45) [A]
 USS Rehoboth (AGS-50), ex-AVP-50
 USNS John McDonnell (T-AGS-51)
 USNS Littlehales (T-AGS-52)

Pathfinder-class

 USNS Pathfinder (T-AGS-60) [A]
 USNS Sumner (T-AGS-61) [I]
 USNS Bowditch (T-AGS-62) [A]
 USNS Henson (T-AGS-63) [A]
 USNS Bruce C. Heezen (T-AGS-64) [A]
 USNS Mary Sears (T-AGS-65) [A]
 USNS Maury (T-AGS-66) [A]
 USNS Robert Ballard (T-AGS-67) [P]

Coastal Survey Ships (AGSC)

 USS Dutton (AGSC-8), ex-AGS-8
 USS John Blish (AGSC-10), ex-AGS-10
 USS Harkness (AGSC-12), ex-AGS-12, later AMCU-12
 USS James M. Gilliss (AGSC-13), ex-AGS-13, later AMCU-13
 USS Simon Newcomb (AGSC-14), ex-AGS-14
 USS Littlehales (AGSC-15), ex-YF-854

Auxiliary Submarines (AGSS)

Technical Research Ships (AGTR)
Signals intelligence collection vessels.

Oxford-class
 USS Oxford (AGTR-1), ex-AG-159
 USS Georgetown (AGTR-2), ex-AG-165
 USS Jamestown (AGTR-3), ex-AG-166
Belmont-class
 USS Belmont (AGTR-4), ex-AG-167
 USS Liberty (AGTR-5), ex-AG-168, damaged on 8 June 1967 by Israeli aircraft and torpedo boats, CTL, 34 killed

Hospital Ships (AH)

 USS Relief (AH-1)
 USS Solace (AH-2)
 USS Comfort (AH-3)
 USS Mercy (AH-4), ex-ID-1305
 USS Solace (AH-5)
 USS Bountiful (AH-9), ex-AP-1
 USS Samaritan (AH-10), ex-AP-5
 USS Refuge (AH-11), ex-AP-62
 USS Benevolence (AH-13), sunk in collision 25 April 1950, 23 killed
 USS Rescue (AH-18), ex-AS-21, AG-67

Comfort-class

 USS Comfort (AH-6)
 USS Hope (AH-7)
 USS Mercy (AH-8)

Haven-class

 USS Haven (AH-12), briefly APH-112
 USS Tranquility (AH-14), briefly APH-114
 USS Consolation (AH-15)
 USS Repose (AH-16)
 USS Sanctuary (AH-17)

Mercy-class

 USNS Mercy (T-AH-19) [A]
 USNS Comfort (T-AH-20) [A]

Dry Cargo Ships (AK, T-AK)

 USS Houston (AK-1)
 USS Kittery (AK-2)
 USS Newport News (AK-3)
 USS Bath (AK-4)
 USS Gulfport (AK-5), ex-SP-2989
 USS Beaufort (AK-6), ex-ID-3008
 USS Pensacola (AK-7), later AG-13
 USS Astoria (AK-8), ex-ID-2005
 USS Long Beach (AK-9), ex-ID-2136
 USS Quincy (AK-10)
 USS Robert L. Barnes (AK-11), ex-ID-3088, later AO-14, AG-27
 USS Arcturus (AK-12) / USS Gold Star (AK-12), later AG-12
 USS Capella (AK-13)
 USS Regulus (AK-14)
 USS Sirius (AK-15)
 USS Spica (AK-16)
 USS Vega (AK-17)
 USS Arcturus (AK-18), later AKA-1
 USS Procyon (AK-19), later AKA-2
 USS Bellatrix (AK-20), later AKA-3
 USS Electra (AK-21), later AKA-4
 USS Fomalhaut (AK-22), later AKA-5, AE-20
 USS Alchiba (AK-23), later AKA-6
 USS Alcyone (AK-24), later AKA-7
 USS Algorab (AK-25), later AKA-8
 USS Alhena (AK-26), later AKA-9
 USS Almaack (AK-27), later AKA-10
 USS Betelgeuse (AK-28), later AKA-11
 USS Delta (AK-29)
 USS Hamul (AK-30)
 USS Markab (AK-31)
 , not commissioned
 West Elcasco (AK-33), ex-ID-3661, not commissioned, later AE-7
 Meigs (AK-34), ex-ID-4490, not commissioned
 Liberty (AK-35), ex-ID-3461, not commissioned
 , not commissioned
 , ex-ID-3696, not commissioned
 USS Mendocino (AK-39)
 USS Hercules (AK-41)
 USS Mercury (AK-42)
 USS Jupiter (AK-43), later AVS-8
 USS Aroostook (AK-44), ex-ID-1256, ex-CM-3
 USS Stratford (AK-45)
 USS Pleiades (AK-46)
 USS Aquila (AK-47)
 USS Pegasus (AK-48)
 USS Saturn (AK-49)
 USS Aries (AK-51), ex-AG-37
 USS Matinicus (AK-52), ex-AG-38, later AP-75
 USS Libra (AK-53), later AKA-12
 USS Pollux (AK-54), later AKS-4
 USS Titana (AK-55), later AKA-13
 USS Oberon (AK-56), later AKA-14
 USS Thomas Jefferson (AK-57)
 USS Kopara (AK-62), later AG-50
 USS Asterion (AK-63)
 USS Andromeda (AK-64), later AKA-15
 USS Aquarius (AK-65), later AKA-16
 USS Centaurus (AK-66), later AKA-17
 USS Cepheus (AK-67), later AKA-18
 USS Thuban (AK-68), later AKA-19
 USS Virgo (AK-69), later AKA-20, AE-30
 USS Crater (AK-70)
 USS Adhara (AK-71)
 USS Aludra (AK-72)
 USS Arided (AK-73)
 USS Carina (AK-74)
 USS Cassiopeia (AK-75)
 USS Celeno (AK-76)
 USS Cetus (AK-77)
 USS Deimos (AK-78)
 USS Draco (AK-79)
 USS Enceladus (AK-80)
  (not commissioned)
 USS Hydra (AK-82)
  (not commissioned)
  (not commissioned)
  (not commissioned)
  (not commissioned)
 USNS Sagitta (T-AK-87)
  (not commissioned)
 USS Vela (AK-89)
 USS Albireo (AK-90)
 USS Cor Caroli (AK-91)
 USS Eridanus (AK-92)
 USS Etamin (AK-93)
 USS Mintaka (AK-94)
 USS Murzim (AK-95)
 USS Sterope (AK-96)
 USS Serpens (AK-97), destroyed by explosion 29 January 1945, 255 killed
 USS Auriga (AK-98)
 USS Bootes (AK-99)
 USS Lynx (AK-100)
 USS Asterion (AK-100) – duplicate number for Q-ship (armed decoy), ex-ID-2228
 USS Lyra (AK-101)
 USS Atik (AK-101) – duplicate number for Q-ship (armed decoy), sunk by torpedo 26 March 1942, ex-ID-1608
 USS Triangulum (AK-102)
 USS Sculptor (AK-103)
 USS Ganymede (AK-104)
 USS Naos (AK-105)
 USS Caelum (AK-106)
 USS Hyperion (AK-107)
 USS Rotanin (AK-108)
 USS Allioth (AK-109), later IX-204, AVS-4
 USS Alkes (AK-110)
 USS Giansar (AK-111)
 USS Grumium (AK-112), later IX-174, AVS-3
 USS Rutilicus (AK-113)
 USS Alkaid (AK-114)
 USS Crux (AK-115)
 USS Alderamin (AK-116)
 USS Zaurak (AK-117)
 USS Shaula (AK-118)
 USS Matar (AK-119)
 USS Zaniah (AK-120), later AG-70
 USS Sabik (AK-121)
 USS Baham (AK-122), later AG-71
 USS Menkar (AK-123)
 USS Azimech (AK-124)
 USS Lesuth (AK-125)
 USS Megrez (AK-126)
 USS Alnitah (AK-127)
 USS Leonis (AK-128)
 USS Phobos (AK-129)
 USS Arkab (AK-130)
 USS Melucta (AK-131)
 USS Propus (AK-132)
 USS Seginus (AK-133)
 USS Syrma (AK-134)
 USS Venus (AK-135)
 USS Ara (AK-136)
 USS Ascella (AK-137)
 USS Cheleb (AK-138)
 USS Pavo (AK-139)
 USS Situla (AK-140)
 USS Alamosa (AK-156)
 USS Alcona (AK-157)
 USS Amador (AK-158)
 USS Antrim (AK-159)
 USS Autauga (AK-160)
 USS Beaverhead (AK-161)
 USS Beltrami (AK-162)
 USS Blount (AK-163)
 USS Brevard (AK-164)
 USS Bullock (AK-165)
 USS Cabell (AK-166)
 USS Caledonia (AK-167)
 USS Charlevoix (AK-168)
 USS Chatham (AK-169)
 USS Chicot (AK-170)
 USS Claiborne (AK-171)
 USS Clarion (AK-172)
 USS Codington (AK-173)
 USS Colquitt (AK-174)
 USS Craighead (AK-175)
 USS Doddridge (AK-176) (cancelled   8/16/45)
 USS Duval (AK-177) (cancelled   8/16/45)
 USS Fairfield (AK-178)
 USS Faribault (AK-179)
 USS Fentress (AK-180)
 USS Flagler (AK-181)
 USS Gadsden (AK-182)
 USS Glacier (AK-183)
 USS Grainger (AK-184)
 USS Gwinnett (AK-185), later AG-92, AVS-5
 USS Habersham (AK-186)
 USS Hennepin (AK-187)
 USS Herkimer (AK-188)
 USS Hidalgo (AK-189)
 USS Kenosha (AK-190)
 USS Lebanon (AK-191)
 USS Lehigh (AK-192)
 USS Lancaster (AK-193)
 USS Marengo (AK-194)
 USS Midland (AK-195)
 USS Minidoka (AK-196)
 USS Muscatine (AK-197)
 USS Muskingum (AK-198)
 USS Nicollet (AK-199), later AG-93, AVS-6
 USS Pembina (AK-200)
 USS Pemiscot (AK-201)
 USS Pinellas (AK-202)
 USS Pipestone (AK-203)
 USS Pitkin (AK-204)
 USS Poinsett (AK-205)
 USS Pontotoc (AK-206), later AG-94, AVS-7
 USS Richland (AK-207)
 USS Rockdale (AK-208)
 USS Schuyler (AK-209)
 USS Screven (AK-210)
 USS Sebastian (AK-211)
 USS Somerset (AK-212)
 USS Sussex (AK-213)
 USS Tarrant (AK-214)
 USS Tipton (AK-215)
 USS Traverse (AK-216) (cancelled 8/45)
 USS Tulare (AK-217) (cancelled 8/45)
 USS Washtenaw (AK-218)
 USS Westchester (AK-219) (cancelled 8/45)
 USS Wexford (AK-220), later T-AGM-16, AGS-36
 USS Kenmore (AK-221), ex-AP-162
 USS Livingston (AK-222), ex-AP-163
 USS De Grasse (AK-223), ex-AP-164
 USS Prince Georges (AK-224), ex-AP-165
 USS Allegan (AK-225)
 USS Appanoose (AK-226)
 USS Boulder Victory (AK-227)
 USS Provo Victory (AK-228)
 USS Las Vegas Victory (AK-229)
 USS Manderson Victory (AK-230)
 USS Bedford Victory (AK-231)
 USS Mayfield Victory (AK-232)
 USS Newcastle Victory (AK-233)
 USS Bucyrus Victory (AK-234)
 USS Red Oak Victory (AK-235)
 USS Lakewood Victory (AK-236)
 USNS Greenville Victory (T-AK-237)
 USNS Haiti Victory (T-AK-238)
 USNS Kingsport Victory (T-AK-239), later T-AG-164
 USNS Private John R. Towle (T-AK-240)
 USNS Private Francis X. McGraw (T-AK-241)
 USNS Sgt. Andrew Miller (T-AK-242)
 USNS Sgt. Archer T. Gammon (T-AK-243)
 USNS Sgt. Morris E. Crain (T-AK-244)
 USNS Captain Arlo L. Olson (T-AK-245)
 USNS Col. William J. O’Brien (T-AK-246)
 USNS Private John F. Thorson (T-AK-247)
 USNS Sgt. George Peterson (T-AK-248)
 USNS Short Splice (T-AK-249)
 USNS Private Frank J. Petrarca (T-AK-250)
 USNS Lt. George W. G. Boyce (T-AK-251)
 USNS Lt. Robert Craig (T-AK-252)
 USNS Private Joe E. Mann (T-AK-253)
 USNS Sgt. Truman Kimbro (T-AK-254)
 USNS Private Leonard C. Brostrom (T-AK-255)
 USNS Dalton Victory (T-AK-256)
 USS Altair (AK-257)
 USS Antares (AK-258)
 USS Alcor (AK-259)
 USS Betelgeuse (AK-260)
 USS Alchiba (AK-261)
 USS Algorab (AK-262)
 USS Aquarius (AK-263)
 USS Centaurus (AK-264)
 USS Cepheus (AK-265)
 USS Serpens (AK-266)
 USNS Marine Fiddler (T-AK-267)
 USNS Comet (T-AK-269)
 USNS Eltanin (T-AK-270)
 USNS Mirfak (T-AK-271)
 USNS Mizar (T-AK-272), later T-AGOR-11
 USNS Taurus (T-AK-273), ex-LSD-23, later T-LSV-8
 USNS Lt. James E. Robinson (T-AK-274), ex-T-AG-170
 USNS Pvt. Joseph F. Merrell (T-AK-275)
 USNS Sgt. Jack J. Pendleton (T-AK-276), grounded 23 September 1973, CTL
 USNS Schuyler Otis Bland (T-AK-277)
 USNS Norwalk (T-AK-279)
 USNS Furman (T-AK-280)
 USNS Victoria (T-AK-281)
 USNS Marshfield (T-AK-282)
 USNS Wyandot (T-AK-283)
 USNS Northern Light (T-AK-284)
 USNS Southern Cross (T-AK-285)
 USNS Vega (T-AK-286)
 USNS Algol (T-AK-287)
 USNS Bellatrix (T-AK-288)
 USNS Denebola (T-AK-289)
 USNS Pollux (T-AK-290)
 USNS Altair (T-AK-291)
 USNS Regulus (T-AK-292)
 USNS Capella (T-AK-293)
 USNS Antares (T-AK-294)
 /
 USNS Cleveland (T-AK-851)
 USNS Austral Rainbow (T-AK-1005)
 USNS Cape Nome (T-AK-1014)
 USNS Marine Adder (T-AK-2005), ex-T-AP-193
 USNS Pioneer Commander (T-AK-2016)
 USNS Pioneer Contractor (T-AK-2018)
 USNS Pioneer Crusader (T-AK-2019)
 USNS Buyer (T-AK-2033)
 USNS Gulf Shipper (T-AK-2035)
 USNS Gulf Trader (T-AK-2036)
 
 
 USNS Green Valley (T-AK-2049)
 USNS Green Wave (T-AK-2050)
 USNS American Cormorant (T-AK-2062)
 USNS Green Harbour (T-AK-2064)
 MV Cpl. Louis J. Hauge Jr. (T-AK-3000)
 
 
 
 
 
 
 
 USNS 2nd Lt John P. Bobo (T-AK-3008)
 
 
 
 
 USNS 1st Lt. Harry L. Martin (T-AK-3015)
 USNS LCPL Roy M. Wheat (T-AK-3016)
 USNS GySgt. Fred W. Stockham (T-AK-3017)
 
 
 
 
 
 
 USNS Cape Adventurer (T-AK-5005)
 USNS Cape Aide (T-AK-5006)
 USNS Cape Ambassador (T-AK-5007)
 USNS Banner (T-AK-5008)
 USNS Cape Ann (T-AK-5009)
 USNS Cape Avinoff (T-AK-5013)
 USNS Agent (T-AK-5015)
 USNS Lake (T-AK-5016)
 USNS Pride (T-AK-5017)
 USNS Scan (T-AK-5018)
 
 USNS Cape John (T-AK-5022)
 USNS Del Viento (T-AK-5026)
 
 USNS Cape Chalmers (T-AK-5036)
 USNS Cape Canso (T-AK-5037)
 USNS Cape Charles (T-AK-5038)
 USNS Cape Clear (T-AK-5039)
 USNS Cape Canaveral (T-AK-5040)
 USNS Cape Cod (T-AK-5041)
 USNS Cape Carthage (T-AK-5042)
 USNS Cape Catoche (T-AK-5043)
 USNS Gulf Banker (T-AK-5044)
 USNS Gulf Farmer (T-AK-5045)
 USNS Gulf Merchant (T-AK-5046)
 USNS Del Monte (T-AK-5049)
 USNS Del Valle (T-AK-5050)
 
 USNS Cape Bover (T-AK-5057)
 
 
 
 
 
 USNS Cape Catawba (T-AK-5074)
 
 USNS LTC Calvin P. Titus (T-AK-5089)
 USNS SP5 Eric G. Gibson (T-AK-5091)
 USNS Jeb Stuart (T-AK-9204)
 MV Strong Virginian (T-AK-9205)
 USNS Buffalo Soldier (T-AK-9301)
 USNS American Merlin (T-AK-9302)
 
 USNS American Kestrel (T-AK-9651)
 USNS Noble Star (T-AK-9653)
 USNS Green Ridge (T-AK-9655)
 USNS Advantage (T-AK-9682)

Attack Cargo Ships (AKA)

Cargo Ship Dock (T-AKD)
 USNS Point Barrow (T-AKD-1), later T-AGDS-2

Advanced Auxiliary Dry Cargo Ships (T-AKE)
Advanced Auxiliary Dry Cargo Ships (T-AKE) are designed to deliver ammunition, provisions, stores, spare parts, potable water and petroleum products via underway replenishment; they effectively combine the missions of Ammunition Ships (AE) and Combat Stores Ships (AFS, T-AFS) along with a limited refueling capability.

Lewis and Clark-class

 USNS Lewis and Clark (T-AKE-1) [A]
 USNS Sacagawea (T-AKE-2) [A]
 USNS Alan Shepard (T-AKE-3) [A]
 USNS Richard E. Byrd (T-AKE-4) [A]
 USNS Robert E. Peary (T-AKE-5) [A]
 USNS Amelia Earhart (T-AKE-6) [A]
 USNS Carl Brashear (T-AKE-7) [A]
 USNS Wally Schirra (T-AKE-8) [A]
 USNS Matthew Perry (T-AKE-9) [A]
 USNS Charles Drew (T-AKE-10) [A]
 USNS Washington Chambers (T-AKE-11) [A]
 USNS William McLean (T-AKE-12) [A]
 USNS Medgar Evers (T-AKE-13) [A]
 USNS Cesar Chavez (T-AKE-14) [A]

Small Cargo Ships (AKL)

 USS Camano (AKL-1), ex-AG-130
 USS Deal (AKL-2), ex-AG-131
 USS Elba (AKL-3), ex-AG-132
 USS Errol (AKL-4), ex-AG-133
 USS Estero (AKL-5), ex-AG-134
 USS Jekyl (AKL-6), ex-AG-135
 USS Metomkin (AKL-7), ex-AG-136
 USS Roque (AKL-8), ex-AG-137
 USS Ryer (AKL-9), ex-AG-138
 USS Sharps (AKL-10), ex-AG-139
 USS Torry (AKL-11), ex-AG-140
 USS Mark (AKL-12), ex-AG-143
 USNS Tingles (T-AKL-13)
 USS Hewell (AKL-14), ex-AG-145
 USS AKL-15
 USS AKL-16
 USNS New Bedford (AKL-17), later IX-308
 USS AKL-18
 USS AKL-19
 USNS T-AKL-20
 USS AKL-21
 USS AKL-22
 USS AKL-23
 USS AKL-24
 USS Banner (AKL-25), later AGER-1
 USS AKL-26
 USNS T-AKL-27
 USS Brule (AKL-28)
 USS AKL-29
 USNS AKL-30 (T-AKL-30)
 USS AKL-31
 USS AKL-32
 USS AKL-33
 USS AKL-34
 USS AKL-35
 USS AKL-36
 USS Alcyone (AKL-37)
 USS Alhena (AKL-38)
 USS Almaack (AKL-39)
 USS Deimos (AKL-40)
 USS AKL-41
 USS Renate (AKL-42)
 USS AKL-43
 USS Pueblo (AKL-44), later AGER-2 [I]
 USS Palm Beach (AKL-45), later AGER-3
 USNS Redbud (T-AKL-398), ex-WLB-398

Net Cargo Ships (AKN)
Indus class

 USS Indus (AKN-1)
 USS Sagittarius (AKN-2)
 USS Tuscana (AKN-3)
 USS Zebra (AKN-5)

Other classes
 USS Keokuk (AKN-4), ex-AN-5, ex-CM-8, ex-CMc-6
 USS Galilea (AKN-6), ex-Montauk (LSV-6)

Vehicle Cargo Ships (T-AKR)

 USNS Comet (T-AKR-7), ex-LSV-7
 USNS Meteor (T-AKR-9), ex-LSV-9
  [A]
  [A]

Cape-T-class

  [A]
  [A]

Algol-class

 USNS Algol (T-AKR-287) [A]
 USNS Bellatrix (T-AKR-288) [A]
 USNS Denebola (T-AKR-289) [A]
 USNS Pollux (T-AKR-290) [A]
 USNS Altair (T-AKR-291) [A]
 USNS Regulus (T-AKR-292) [A]
 USNS Capella (T-AKR-293) [A]
 USNS Antares (T-AKR-294) [A]

Shughart-Class

 USNS Shughart (T-AKR-295) [A]
 USNS Yano (T-AKR-297) [A]
 USNS Soderman (T-AKR-299) [A]

Gordon-Class

 USNS Gordon (T-AKR-296) [A]
 USNS Gilliland (T-AKR-298) [A]

Bob Hope-class

 USNS Bob Hope (T-AKR-300) [A]
 USNS Fisher (T-AKR-301) [A]
 USNS Seay (T-AKR-302) [A]
 USNS Mendonca (T-AKR-303) [A]
 USNS Pililaau (T-AKR-304) [A]
 USNS Brittin (T-AKR-305) [A]
 USNS Benavidez (T-AKR-306) [A]

Watson-class

 USNS Watson (T-AKR-310) [A]
 USNS Sisler (T-AKR-311) [A]
 USNS Dahl (T-AKR-312) [A]
 USNS Red Cloud (T-AKR-313) [A]
 USNS Charlton (T-AKR-314) [A]
 USNS Watkins (T-AKR-315) [A]
 USNS Pomeroy (T-AKR-316) [A]
 USNS Soderman (T-AKR-317) [A]

Other classes

  [A]
 
  [A]
  [A]
 
 
 
 
  [A]
 
  [I]
 
  [A]
  [A]
  [A]
  [A]
  [A]
  [A]
 
 
  [A]
  [A]
  [A]
  [A]
  [A]
  [A]
  [A]
  [A]
  [A]
  [A]

General Stores Issue Ships (AKS)

 USS Castor (AKS-1)
 USS Pollux (AKS-2), wrecked Newfoundland 18 February 1942, 93 killed
 USS Antares (AKS-3), ex-AG-10
 USS Pollux (AKS-4)
 USS Acubens (AKS-5)
 USS Kochab (AKS-6)
 USS Luna (AKS-7)
 USS Talita (AKS-8)
 USS Volans (AKS-9)
 USS Cybele (AKS-10)
 USS Gratia (AKS-11)
 USS Hecuba (AKS-12)
 USS Hesperia (AKS-13)
 USS Iolanda (AKS-14)
 USS Liguria (AKS-15)
 USS Blackford (AKS-16)
 USS Dorchester (AKS-17)
 USS Kingman (AKS-18)
 USS Presque Isle (AKS-19)
 USS Mercury (AKS-20)
 USS Belle Isle (AKS-21), ex-AG-73
 USS Coasters Harbor (AKS-22), ex-AG-74
 USS Cuttyhunk Island (AKS-23), ex-AG-75
 USS Avery Island (AKS-24), ex-AG-76
 USS Indian Island (AKS-25), ex-AG-77
 USS Kent Island (AKS-26), ex-AG-78
 USS Electron (AKS-27), ex-LST-1070, AG-146
 USS Proton (AKS-28), ex-LST-1078, AG-147
 USS Colington (AKS-29), ex-LST-1085, AG-148
 USS League Island (AKS-30), ex-LST-1097, AG-149
 USS Chimon (AKS-31), ex-LST-1102, AG-150
 USS Altair (AKS-32)
 USS Antares (AKS-33)

Aircraft Transports (AKV, T-AKV)

 USS Kitty Hawk (AKV-1), ex-APV-1
 USS Hammondsport (AKV-2)
 USNS LT. James E. Robinson (T-AKV-3), later T-AK-274, T-AG-170
 USNS Pvt. Joseph F. Merrell (T-AKV-4), later T-AK-275
 USNS Sgt. Jack J. Pendleton (T-AKV-5), later T-AK-276
 USNS Albert M. Boe (T-AKV-6)
 USNS Cardinal O'Connell (T-AKV-7)
 USS Kula Gulf (AKV-8), ex-CVE-108
 USS Cape Gloucester (AKV-9), ex-CVE-109
 USS Salerno Bay (AKV-10), ex-CVE-110
 USS Vella Gulf (AKV-11), ex-CVE-111
 USS Siboney (AKV-12), ex-CVE-112
 USS Puget Sound (AKV-13), ex-CVE-113
 USS Rendova (AKV-14), ex-CVE-114
 USS Bairoko (AKV-15), ex-CVE-115
 USS Badoeng Strait (AKV-16), ex-CVE-116
 USS Saidor (AKV-17), ex-CVE-117
 USS Sicily (AKV-18), ex-CVE-118
 USS Point Cruz (AKV-19), ex-CVE-119
 USS Mindoro (AKV-20), ex-CVE-120
 USS Rabaul (AKV-21), ex-CVE-121, CVHE-121
 USS Palau (AKV-22), ex-CVE-122
 USS Tinian (AKV-23), ex-CVE-123, CVHE-123
 USS Nehenta Bay (AKV-24), ex-CVE-74
 USS Hoggatt Bay (AKV-25), ex-CVE-75
 USS Kadashan Bay (AKV-26), ex-CVE-76
 USS Marcus Island (AKV-27), ex-CVE-77
 USS Savo Island (AKV-28), ex-CVE-78
 USS Rudyerd Bay (AKV-29), ex-CVE-81
 USS Sitkoh Bay (AKV-30), ex-CVE-86
 USS Takanis Bay (AKV-31), ex-CVE-89
 USS Lunga Point (AKV-32), ex-CVE-94
 USS Hollandia (AKV-33), ex-CVE-97
 USS Kwajalein (AKV-34), ex-CVE-98
 USS Bougainville (AKV-35), ex-CVE-100
 USS Matanikau (AKV-36), ex-CVE-101
 USS Commencement Bay (AKV-37), ex-CVE-105, CVHE-105
 USS Block Island (AKV-38), ex-CVE-106, LPH-1
 USS Gilbert Islands (AKV-39), ex-CVE-107, later AGMR-1
 USS Card (T-AKV-40), ex-AVG-11, ACV-11, CVE-11, CVHE-11, CVU-11, T-CVU-11, sunk 2 May 1964 Saigon, Vietnam, 5 killed, repaired
 USNS Core (T-AKV-41), ex-AVG-13, ACV-13, CVE-13, CVHE-13, CVU-13
 USNS Breton (T-AKV-42), ex-AVG-23, ACV-23, CVE-23
 USNS Croatan (T-AKV-43), ex-AVG-25, ACV-25, CVE-25

Auxiliary Minesweepers

Minesweepers (AM)

Auxiliary Base Minesweepers (AMb)

Coastal Minesweepers (AMc)

Coastal Minesweepers (Underwater Locator) (AMCU)

Ocean Minesweepers (AMS)

Net Laying Ships (AN)

 USS Monitor (AN-1), later AP-160, LSV-5, MCS-5
 USS Montauk (AN-2), later AP-161, LSV-6, AKN-6
 USS Osage (AN-3), later AP-108, LSV-3,  MCS-3
 USS Saugus (AN-4), later AP-109, LSV-4, MCS-4
 USS Keokuk (AN-5), later CM-8, CMc-6, AKN-4

All of the following ships were originally classed as Yard Net Tenders, see  for the original hull numbers.

Aloe-class net laying ships

 USS Aloe (AN-6)
 USS Ash (AN-7)
 USS Boxwood (AN-8)
 USS Butternut (AN-9)
 USS Catalpa (AN-10)
 USS Chestnut (AN-11)
 USS Cinchona (AN-12)
 USS Buckeye (AN-13)
 USS Buckthorn (AN-14)
 USS Ebony (AN-15)
 USS Eucalyptus (AN-16)
 USS Chinquapin (AN-17)
 USS Gum Tree (AN-18)
 USS Holly (AN-19)
 USS Elder (AN-20)
 USS Larch (AN-21)
 USS Locust (AN-22)
 USS Mahogany (AN-23)
 USS Mango (AN-24)
 USS Hackberry (AN-25)
 USS Mimosa (AN-26)
 USS Mulberry (AN-27)
 USS Palm (AN-28)
 USS Hazel (AN-29)
 USS Redwood (AN-30)
 USS Rosewood (AN-31)
 USS Sandalwood (AN-32)
 USS Nutmeg (AN-33)
 USS Teaberry (AN-34)
 USS Teak (AN-35)
 USS Pepperwood (AN-36)
 USS Yew (AN-37)

Ailanthus-class net laying ships

 USS Ailanthus (AN-38), wrecked Aleutians 26 February 1944
 USS Bitterbush (AN-39)
 USS Anaqua (AN-40)
 USS Baretta (AN-41)
 USS Cliffrose (AN-42)
 USS Satinleaf (AN-43)
 USS Corkwood (AN-44)
 USS Cornel (AN-45)
 USS Mastic (AN-46)
 USS Canotia (AN-47)
 USS Lancewood (AN-48)
 USS Papaya (AN-49)
 USS Cinnamon (AN-50)
 USS Silverbell (AN-51)
 USS Snowbell (AN-52), wrecked by Typhoon Louise Okinawa October 1945
 USS Spicewood (AN-53)
 USS Manchineel (AN-54)
 USS Torchwood (AN-55)
 USS Winterberry (AN-56)
 USS Viburnum (AN-57)
 USS Abele (AN-58)
 USS Terebinth (AN-59)
 USS Catclaw (AN-60)
 USS Chinaberry (AN-61)
 USS Hoptree (AN-62)
 USS Whitewood (AN-63), later AG-129
 USS Palo Blanco (AN-64)
 USS Palo Verde (AN-65)
 USS Pinon (AN-66)
 USS Shellbark (AN-67)
 USS Silverleaf (AN-68)
 USS Stagbush (AN-69)
 USS Allthorn (AN-70)
 USS Tesota (AN-71)
 USS Yaupon (AN-72)
 USS Precept (AN-73)
 USS Boxelder (AN-74)
 USS Prefect (AN-75)
 USS Satinwood (AN-76)
 USS Seagrape (AN-77)

Cohoes-class net laying ships

 USS Cohoes (AN-78)
 USS Etlah (AN-79)
 USS Suncook (AN-80)
 USS Manayunk (AN-81)
 USS Marietta (AN-82)
 USS Nahant (AN-83)
 USS Naubuc (AN-84)
 USS Oneota (AN-85)
 USS Passaconaway (AN-86)
 USS Passaic (AN-87)
 USS Shakamaxon (AN-88)
 USS Tonawanda (AN-89)
 USS Tunxis (AN-90)
 USS Waxsaw (AN-91)
 USS Yazoo (AN-92)

Fleet Oilers (AO, T-AO)

Fast Combat Support Ships (AOE, T-AOE)

Gasoline Tankers (AOG, T-AOG)

Patapsco class

 USS Patapsco (AOG-1)
 USS Kern (AOG-2)
 USS Rio Grande (AOG-3)
 USS Wabash (AOG-4)
 USS Susquehanna (AOG-5)
 USS Agawam (AOG-6)
 USS Elkhorn (AOG-7)
 USS Genesee (AOG-8)
 USS Kishwaukee (AOG-9)
 USS Nemasket (AOG-10)
 USS Tombigbee (AOG-11)
 USS Chehalis (AOG-48), exploded and sank, Tutuila, American Samoa, 7 October 1949, 6 killed
 USS Chestatee (AOG-49)
 USS Chewaucan (AOG-50)
 USS Maquoketa (AOG-51)
 USS Mattabesset (AOG-52)
 USS Namakogon (AOG-53)
 USS Natchaug (AOG-54)
 USS Nespelen (AOG-55)
 USS Noxubee (AOG-56)
 USS Pecatonica (AOG-57)
 USS Pinnebog (AOG-58)
 USS Wacissa (AOG-59)

Halawa class

 USS Halawa (AOG-12)
 USS Conasauga (AOG-15)

Mettawee class

 USS Mettawee (AOG-17)
 USS Pasquotank (AOG-18)
 USS Sakatonchee (AOG-19)
 USS Seekonk (AOG-20)
 USS Sequatchie (AOG-21)
 USS Wautauga (AOG-22)
 USS Ammonusuc (AOG-23)
 USS Sheepscot (AOG-24), wrecked off Iwo Jima 6 June 1945
 USS Calamus (AOG-25)
 USS Chiwaukum (AOG-26)
 USS Escatawpa (AOG-27)
 USS Gualala (AOG-28)
 USS Hiwassee (AOG-29)
 USS Kalamazoo (AOG-30)
 USS Kanawha (AOG-31)
 USS Narraguagas (AOG-32)
 USS Ochlockonee (AOG-33)
 USS Oconee (AOG-34)
 USS Ogeechee (AOG-35)
 USS Ontonagon (AOG-36)
 USS Yahara (AOG-37)
 USS Ponchatoula (AOG-38)
 USS Quastinet (AOG-39)
 USS Sacandaga (AOG-40)
 USS Tetonkaha (AOG-41)
 USS Towaliga (AOG-42)
 USS Tularosa (AOG-43)
 USS Wakulla (AOG-44)
 USS Yacona (AOG-45)
 USS Waupaca (AOG-46)
 USS Manokin (AOG-60)
 USS Sakonnet (AOG-61)
 USS Conemaugh (AOG-62)
 USS Klaskanine (AOG-63)

Klickitat class

 USS Klickitat (AOG-64)
 USS Michigamme (AOG-65)
 USS Nanticoke (AOG-66)
 USS Peconic (AOG-68)
 USS Petaluma (AOG-69), not commissioned
 USS Piscataqua (AOG-70), not commissioned

Other / unknown classes

 USS Kaloli (AOG-13)
 USS Aroostook (AOG-14)
 USS Guyandot (AOG-16)
 USS Shikellamy (AOG-47), ex-AO-90
 USS Nordaway (AOG-67)
 USS Quinnebaug (AOG-71)
 USS Sebasticook (AOG-72)
 USS Kiamichi (AOG-73)
 USS Tellico (AOG-74)
 USS Truckee (AOG-75)
 USNS Tonti (T-AOG-76)
 USNS Rincon (T-AOG-77)
 USNS Nodaway (T-AOG-78)
 USNS Petaluma (T-AOG-79)
 USNS Piscataqua (T-AOG-80)
 USNS Alatna (T-AOG-81)
 USNS Chattahoochee (T-AOG-82)

Replenishment Oilers (AOR)

Oiler Submarines (AOSS)

Oil Transporters (T-AOT)

Transports (AP, T-AP)

 USS Henderson (AP-1), later AH-9
 USS Doyen (AP-2), later APA-1
 USS Hancock (AP-3), later IX-12
 USS Argonne (AP-4), later AS-10
 USS Chaumont (AP-5), later AH-10
 USS William Ward Burrows (AP-6)
 USS Wharton (AP-7)
 USS Harris (AP-8), later APA-2
 USS Zeilin (AP-9), later APA-3
 USS McCawley (AP-10), later APA-4
 USS Barnett (AP-11), later APA-5
 USS Heywood (AP-12), later APA-6
 USS George F. Elliott (AP-13), ex-ID-3514, sunk by aircraft near Guadalcanal 8 August 1942
 USS Fuller (AP-14), later APA-7
 USS William P. Biddle (AP-15), later APA-8
 USS Neville (AP-16), ex-SP-2676, later APA-9
 USS Harry Lee (AP-17), later APA-10
 USS Catlin (AP-19), ex-ID-3018
 USS Munargo (AP-20)
 USS Wakefield (AP-21)
 USS Mount Vernon (AP-22)
 USS West Point (AP-23)
 USS Orizaba (AP-24), ex-ID-1536
 USS Leonard Wood (AP-25), later APA-12
 USS Joseph T. Dickman (AP-26), later APA-13
 USS Hunter Liggett (AP-27), later APA-14
 USS Kent (AP-28), ex-ID-3804
 USS U. S. Grant (AP-29), ex-ID-3011
 USS Henry T. Allen (AP-30), later APA-15, AG-90
 USS Chateau Thierry (AP-31)
 USS St Mihiel (AP-32)
 USS Republic (AP-33), ex-ID-3014
 USS J. Franklin Bell (AP-34), later APA-16
 USS American Legion (AP-35), later APA-17
 Santa Ana (AP-36), ex-ID-2869, not commissioned
 USS President Jackson (AP-37), later APA-18
 USS President Adams (AP-38), later APA-19
 USS President Hayes (AP-39), later APA-20
 USS Crescent City (AP-40), later APA-21
 USS Stratford (AP-41)
 USS Tasker H. Bliss (AP-42), sunk by torpedo Morocco 12 November 1942, 31 killed
 USS Hugh L. Scott (AP-43), sunk by torpedo Morocco 12 November 1942, 59 killed
 Willard A. Holbrook (AP-44), not commissioned
 Thomas H. Barry (AP-45), not commissioned
 James Parker (AP-46), not commissioned
 J.W. McAndrew (AP-47), not commissioned
 Frederick Funston (AP-48), later APA-89
 James O'Hara (AP-49), later APA-90
 USS Joseph Hewes (AP-50), later APA-22
 USS John Penn (AP-51), later APA-23
 USS Edward Rutledge (AP-52), later APA-24
 USS Lafayette (AP-53), ex-Normandie, burned and sank 9 February 1942
 USS Hermitage (AP-54)
 USS Arthur Middleton (AP-55), later APA-25
 USS Samuel Chase (AP-56), later APA-26
 USS George Clymer (AP-57), later APA-27
 USS Charles Carroll (AP-58), later APA-28
 USS Thomas Stone (AP-59), later APA-29
 USS Thomas Jefferson (AP-60), later APA-30
 USS Monticello (AP-61)
 USS Kenmore (AP-62), later AH-11
 USS Rochambeau (AP-63)
 USS Monrovia (AP-64), later APA-31
 USS Calvert (AP-65), later APA-32
 USS Ancon (AP-66), later AGC-4
 USS Dorothea L. Dix (AP-67)
 Alameda (AP-68) (name assigned, never used)
 USS Elizabeth C. Stanton (AP-69)
 USS Florence Nightingale (AP-70)
 USS Lyon (AP-71)
 USS Susan B. Anthony (AP-72)
 USS Leedstown (AP-73), sunk by torpedoes Algiers 9 November 1942, 8 killed
 USS Lejeune (AP-74)
 USS Gemini (AP-75), ex-AG-38, ex-AK-52
 USS Anne Arundel (AP-76)
 USS Thurston (AP-77)
 USS Bayfield (AP-78), later APA-33
 USS Bolivar (AP-79), later APA-34
 USS Callaway (AP-80), later APA-35
 USS Cambria (AP-81), later APA-36
 USS Cavalier (AP-82), later APA-37
 USS Chilton (AP-83), later APA-38
 USS Clay (AP-84), later APA-39
 USS Custer (AP-85), later APA-40
 USS DuPage (AP-86), later APA-41
 USS Elmore (AP-87), later APA-42
 USS Fayette (AP-88), later APA-43
 USS Fremont (AP-89), later APA-44
 USS Henrico (AP-90), later APA-45
 USS Knox (AP-91), later APA-46
 USS Lamar (AP-92), later APA-47
 USS Leon (AP-93), later APA-48
 USS Ormsby (AP-94), later APA-49
 USS Pierce (AP-95), later APA-50
 USS Sheridan (AP-96), later APA-51
 USS Sumter (AP-97), later APA-52
 USS Warren (AP-98), later APA-53
 USS Wayne (AP-99), later APA-54
 USS Windsor (AP-100), later APA-55
 USS Wood (AP-101), later APA-56
 USS Hotspur (AP-102)
 USS President Polk (AP-103)
 USS President Monroe (AP-104)
 USS George F. Elliott (AP-105)
 USS Catskill (AP-106), ex-CM-6, later LSV-1
 USS Ozark (AP-107), ex-CM-7, later LSV-2
 USS Osage (AP-108), ex-AN-3, later LSV-3
 USS Saugus (AP-109), ex-AN-4, later LSV-4
 USS General John Pope (AP-110)
 USS General A. E. Anderson (AP-111)
 USS General W. A. Mann (AP-112)
 USS General H. W. Butner (AP-113)
 USS General William Mitchell (AP-114)
 USS General George M. Randall (AP-115)
 USS General M. C. Meigs (AP-116)
 USS General W. H. Gordon (AP-117)
 USS General W. P. Richardson (AP-118)
 USS General William Weigel (AP-119)
 USS Admiral W. S. Benson (AP-120) / USNS General Daniel I. Sultan (T-AP-120)
 USS Admiral W. L. Capps (AP-121) / USNS General Hugh J. Gaffey (T-AP-121), later IX-507
 USS Admiral R. E. Coontz (AP-122) / USNS General Alexander M. Patch (T-AP-122)
 USS Admiral E. W. Eberle (AP-123) / USNS General Simon B. Buckner (T-AP-123)
 USS Admiral C. F. Hughes (AP-124) / USNS General Edwin D. Patrick (T-AP-124)
 USS Admiral H. T. Mayo (AP-125) / USNS General Nelson M. Walker (T-AP-125)
 USS Admiral Hugh Rodman (AP-126) / USNS General Maurice Rose (T-AP-126)
 USS Admiral W. S. Sims (AP-127) / USNS General William O. Darby (T-AP-127), later IX-510
 USS Admiral D. W. Taylor (AP-128) (cancelled 12/16/44)
 USS Admiral F. B. Upham (AP-129) (cancelled 12/16/44)
 USS General G. O. Squier (AP-130)
 USS General T. H. Bliss (AP-131)
 USS General J. R. Brooke (AP-132)
 USS General Oswald H. Ernst (AP-133)
 USS General R. L. Howze (AP-134)
 USS General W. M. Black (AP-135)
 USS General H. L. Scott (AP-136)
 USS General S. D. Sturgis (AP-137)
 USS General C. G. Morton (AP-138)
 USS General R. E. Callan (AP-139), later T-AGM-9
 USS General M. B. Stewart (AP-140)
 USS General A. W. Greely (AP-141)
 USS General C. H. Muir (AP-142)
 USS General H. B. Freeman (AP-143)
 USS General H. F. Hodges (AP-144)
 USS General Harry Taylor (AP-145), later T-AGM-10
 USS General W. F. Hase (AP-146)
 USS General E. T. Collins (AP-147)
 USS General M. L. Hersey (AP-148)
 USS General J. H. McRae (AP-149)
 USS General M. M. Patrick (AP-150)
 USS General W. C. Langfitt (AP-151)
 USS General Omar Bundy (AP-152)
 USS General R. M. Blatchford (AP-153)
 USS General LeRoy Eltinge (AP-154)
 USS General A. W. Brewster (AP-155)
 USS General D. E. Aultman (AP-156)
 USS General C. C. Ballou (AP-157)
 USS General W. G. Haan (AP-158)
 USS General Stuart Heintzelman (AP-159)
 USS Monitor (AP-160), ex-AN-1, later LSV-5
 USS Montauk (AP-161), ex-AN-2, later LSV-6
 USS Kenmore (AP-162), later AK-221
 USS Livingston (AP-163), later AK-222
 USS De Grasse (AP-164), later AK-223
 USS Prince Georges (AP-165), later AK-224
 USS Comet (AP-166)
 USS John Land (AP-167)
 USS War Hawk (AP-168)
 USS Golden City (AP-169)
 USS Winged Arrow (AP-170)
 USS Storm King (AP-171)
 USS Cape Johnson (AP-172)
 USS Herald of the Morning (AP-173)
 USS Arlington (AP-174)
 USS Starlight (AP-175)
 USS General J. C. Breckinridge (AP-176)
 USS Europa (AP-177)
 USNS Frederick Funston (T-AP-178), ex-APA-89
 USNS James O'Hara (T-AP-179), ex-APA-90
 USNS David C. Shanks (T-AP-180)
 USNS Fred C. Ainsworth (T-AP-181)
 USNS George W. Goethals (T-AP-182)
 USNS Henry Gibbins (T-AP-183)
 USNS Private Elden H. Johnson (T-AP-184), ex-APH-2
 USNS Private William H. Thomas (T-AP-185), ex-APH-3
 USNS Sgt. Charles E. Mower (T-AP-186), ex-APH-1
 USNS Private Joe P. Martinez (T-AP-187)
 USNS Aiken Victory (T-AP-188)
 USNS Lt. Raymond O. Beaudoin (T-AP-189)
 USNS Private Sadao S. Munemori (T-AP-190)
 USNS Sgt. Howard E. Woodford (T-AP-191)
 USNS Sgt. Sylvester Antolak (T-AP-192)
 USNS Marine Adder (T-AP-193), later T-AK-2005
 USNS Marine Lynx (T-AP-194)
 USNS Marine Phoenix (T-AP-195)
 USNS Barrett (T-AP-196)
 USNS Geiger (T-AP-197)
 USNS Upshur (T-AP-198)
 USNS Marine Carp (T-AP-199)
 USNS Marine Serpent (T-AP-202)

Attack Transports (APA)

Self-Propelled Barracks Ships (APB)
Benewah-class barracks ships 

All ships of this class were based on LST hulls, but less than half were converted from actual LSTs.

 USS Benewah (APB-35)
 USS Colleton (APB-36)
 USS Echols (APB-37), later IX-504
 USS Marlboro (APB-38)
 USS Mercer (APB-39), later IX-502, APL-39
 USS Nueces (APB-40), later IX-503, APL-40
 USS Wythe (APB-41)
 USS Yavapai (APB-42)
 USS Yolo (APB-43), ex-LST-677
 USS Presque Isle (APB-44), ex-LST-678
 USS Blackford (APB-45), ex-LST-1111
 USS Dorchester (APB-46),  ex-LST-1112, ex-AKS-17
 USS Kingman (APB-47), ex-LST-1113, ex-AKS-18
 USS Vandenburgh (APB-48)
 USS Accomac (APB-49), ex-LST-710
 USS Cameron (APB-50), ex-LST-928
</div>

Other class
 USS DuPage (APB-51)

Coastal Transports (APC)

 USNS Sgt. Jonah E. Kelley (T-APC-116)
 USNS Sgt. George D. Keathley (T-APC-117)
 USNS Sgt. Joseph E. Muller (T-APC-118)
 USNS Pvt. Jose F. Valdez (T-APC-119)
</div>

Small Coastal Transports (APc)
APc-1-class small coastal transports:

 USS APc-1
 USS APc-2
 USS APc-3
 USS APc-4
 USS APc-5
 USS APc-6
 USS APc-7
 USS APc-8
 USS APc-9
 USS APc-10
 USS APc-11
 USS APc-12
 USS APc-13
 USS APc-14
 USS APc-15
 USS APc-16
 USS APc-17
 USS APc-18
 USS APc-19
 USS APc-20
 USS APc-21, ex-AMc-172, sunk by Japanese aircraft off Arawe New Britain 17 December 1943
 USS APc-22
 USS APc-23
 USS APc-24
 USS APc-25
 USS APc-26
 USS APc-27
 USS APc-28
 USS APc-29
 USS APc-30
 USS APc-31
 USS APc-32
 USS APc-33
 USS APc-34
 USS APc-35
 USS APc-36
 USS APc-37
 USS APc-38
 USS APc-39
 USS APc-40
 USS APc-41
 USS APc-42
 USS APc-43
 USS APc-44
 USS APc-45
 USS APc-46
 USS APc-47
 USS APc-48
 USS APc-49
 USS APc-50
 USS APc-51
 USS APc-52
 USS APc-53
 USS APc-54
 USS APc-55
 USS APc-56
 USS APc-57
 USS APc-58
 USS APc-59
 USS APc-60
 USS APc-61
 USS APc-62
 USS APc-63
 USS APc-64
 USS APc-65
 USS APc-66
 USS APc-67
 USS APc-68
 USS APc-69
 USS APc-70
 USS APc-71
 USS APc-72
 USS APc-73
 USS APc-74
 USS APc-75
 USS APc-76
 USS APc-77
 USS APc-78
 USS APc-79
 USS APc-80 - USS APc-84, canceled
 USS APc-85
 USS APc-86
 USS APc-87
 USS APc-88
 USS APc-89
 USS APc-90
 USS APc-91
 USS APc-92
 USS APc-93
 USS APc-94
 USS APc-95
 USS APc-96
 USS APc-97
 USS APc-98
 USS APc-99, canceled
 USS APc-100, canceled
 USS APc-101
 USS APc-102
 USS APc-103
 USS APc-104 - USS APc-107, canceled
 USS APc-108
 USS APc-109
 USS APc-110
 USS APc-111
 USS APc-112 - USS APc-115, canceled

High-speed Transports (APD)

Evacuation Transports (APH)

 USS Tryon (APH-1), later T-AP-186
 USS Pinkney (APH-2), later T-AP-184
 USS Rixey (APH-3), later T-AP-185
 USS Haven (APH-112), ex- and later AH-12
 USS Tranquillity (APH-114), ex- and later AH-14

Barracks Craft (APL)

 USS APL-1

APL-2 class

 USS APL-2 [A]
 USS APL-3
 USS APL-4 [A]
 USS APL-5 [A]
 USS APL-6
 USS APL-7
 USS APL-8
 USS APL-9
 USS APL-10
 USS APL-11
 USS APL-12, wrecked by Typhoon Louise Okinawa October 1945
 USS APL-13, wrecked by Typhoon Louise Okinawa October 1945
 USS APL-14
 USS APL-15 [A]
 USS APL-16, canceled

APL-17 class

 USS APL-17
 USS APL-18 [A]
 USS APL-19
 USS APL-20
 USS APL-21
 USS APL-22
 USS APL-23
 USS APL-24
 USS APL-25
 USS APL-26
 USS APL-27
 USS APL-28
 USS APL-29 [A]
 USS APL-30
 USS APL-31
 USS APL-32 [A]
 USS APL-33, wrecked by Typhoon Louise Okinawa October 1945
 USS APL-34
 USS APL-35, converted to APB
 USS APL-36, converted to APB
 USS APL-37, converted to APB
 USS APL-38, converted to APB
 USS APL-39, converted to APB
 USS APL-40, converted to APB

APL-41 class

 USS APL-41
 USS APL-42 [A]
 USS APL-43
 USS APL-44
 USS APL-45 [A]
 USS APL-46
 USS APL-47
 USS APL-48
 USS APL-49
 USS APL-50 [A]
 USS APL-51, canceled
 USS APL-52, canceled

APL-53 class

 USS APL-53
 USS APL-54
 USS APL-55, later YRBM-18
 USS APL-56
 USS APL-57
 USS APL-58 [A]

Other classes
 USS APL-59, ex-LST-53
 USS APL-60, ex-Pursuivant

APL-61 class

 USS APL-61 [A]
 USS APL-62 [A]
 USS APL-63
 USS APL-64

APL-65 class
 USS APL-65 [A]
 USS APL-66 [A]

APL-67 class

 USS APL-67 [A]
 USS APL-68 [A]
 USS APL-69 [A]
 USS APL-70 [P]
 USS APL-71 [P]

Mechanized Artillery Transports (APM)

Convoy Rescue Craft (APR)
APR was the original hull symbol intended for the patrol craft escorts that were converted to rescue crews from ships attacked in convoys, but they were instead redesignated as PCERs.

Transport Submarines (APS, APSS)

Transport and Aircraft Ferries (APV)
 USS Kitty Hawk (APV-1), later AKV-1
 USS Hammondsport (APV-2)
 USS Lakehurst (APV-3)

Repair Ships (AR)

 USS Medusa (AR-1)
 USS Bridgeport (AR-2), ex-ID-3009, later AD-10
 USS Prometheus (AR-3), ex-AC-2
 USS Vestal (AR-4), ex-AC-1
 USS Vulcan (AR-5)
 USS Ajax (AR-6)
 USS Hector (AR-7)
 USS Jason (AR-8), ex-ARH-1
 USS Delta (AR-9), ex-AK-29
 USS Alcor (AR-10), ex-AG-34, later AD-34
 USS Rigel (AR-11), ex-AD-13, ARb-1
 USS Briareus (AR-12)
 USS Amphion (AR-13)
 USS Cadmus (AR-14)
 USS Deucalion (AR-15), canceled 12 August 1945
 USS Mars (AR-16), canceled 12 August 1945
 USS Xanthus (AR-19)
 USS Laertes (AR-20)
 USS Dionysus (AR-21)
 USS Klondike (AR-22), ex-AD-22
 USS Markab (AR-23), ex-AD-21
 USS Grand Canyon (AR-28), ex-AD-28

Battle Damage Repair Ships (ARB)

 USS Aristaeus (ARB-1), ex-LST-329
 USS Oceanus (ARB-2), ex-LST-328
 USS Phaon (ARB-3), ex-LST-15
 USS Zeus (ARB-4), ex-LST-132
 USS Midas (ARB-5), ex-LST-514
 USS Nestor (ARB-6), ex-LST-491, wrecked by Typhoon Louise Okinawa October 1945
 USS Sarpedon (ARB-7), ex-LST-956
 USS Telamon (ARB-8), ex-LST-976
 USS Ulysses (ARB-9), ex-LST-967
 USS Demeter (ARB-10), ex-LST-1121
 USS Diomedes (ARB-11), ex-LST-1119
 USS Helios (ARB-12), ex-LST-1127
 USS ARB-13, ex-LST-50

Base Repair Ship (ARb)
 USS Rigel (ARb-1), ex-AD-13, later AR-11

Cable Repair Ships (ARC)

 USS Portunus (ARC-1), ex-LSM–275
 USS Aeolus (ARC-3), ex-AKA-47
 USS Thor (ARC-4), ex-AKA-49
 USS Yamacraw (ARC-5), ex-ACM-9

Neptune-class

 USNS Neptune (T-ARC-2)
 USNS Albert J. Myer (T-ARC-6)

Zeus-class
 USNS Zeus (T-ARC-7) [A]

Two other Navy vessels performed cable support operations without the ARC hull classification: USS Nashawena (AG-142 / YAG-35) and Kailua (IX-71).

Internal Combustion Engine Repair Ships (ARG)
Aroostook-class
 USS Oglala (ARG-1), ex-CM-4

Luzon-class

 USS Luzon (ARG-2)
 USS Mindanao (ARG-3)
 USS Tutuila (ARG-4)
 USS Oahu (ARG-5)
 USS Cebu (ARG-6)
 USS Culebra Island (ARG-7)
 USS Leyte (ARG-8), renamed USS Maui
 USS Mona Island (ARG-9)
 USS Palawan (ARG-10)
 USS Samar (ARG-11)
 USS Kermit Roosevelt (ARG-16)
 USS Hooper Island (ARG-17)

Basilan-class

 USS Basilan (ARG-12), ex-AG-68
 USS Burias (ARG-13), ex-AG-69

Other ships

 USS Dumaran (ARG-14), later ARV-1
 USS Masbate (ARG-15), later ARV-2
 USS Holland (ARG-18), ex-AS-3
 USS Beaver (ARG-19), ex-AS-5
 USS Otus (ARG-20), ex-AS-20

Heavy-hull Repair Ship (ARH)
 USS Jason (ARH-1), later AR-8

Landing Craft Repair Ships (ARL)
Achelous-class repair ship

 USS Achelous (ARL-1), ex-LST-10
 USS Amycus (ARL-2), ex-LST-489
 USS Agenor (ARL-3), ex-LST-490
 USS Adonis (ARL-4), ex-LST-83
 USS ARL-5, ex-LST-81
 USS ARL-6, ex-LST-82
 USS Atlas (ARL-7), ex-LST-231
 USS Egeria (ARL-8), ex-LST-136
 USS Endymion (ARL-9), ex-LST-513
 USS Coronis (ARL-10), ex-LST-1003
 USS Creon (ARL-11), ex-LST-1036
 USS Poseidon (ARL-12), ex-LST-1037
 USS Menelaus (ARL-13), ex-LST-971
 USS Minos (ARL-14), ex-LST-644
 USS Minotaur (ARL-15), ex-LST-645
 USS Myrmidon (ARL-16), ex-LST-948
 USS Numitor (ARL-17), ex-LST-954
 USS Pandemus (ARL-18), ex-LST-650
 USS Patroclus (ARL-19), ex-LST-955
 USS Pentheus (ARL-20), ex-LST-1115
 USS Proserpine (ARL-21), ex-LST-1116
 USS Romulus (ARL-22), ex-LST-961
 USS Satyr (ARL-23), ex-LST-852
 USS Sphinx (ARL-24), ex-LST-962
 USS ARL-25, canceled
 USS Stentor (ARL-26), ex-LST-858
 USS Tantalus (ARL-27), ex-LST-1117
 USS Typhon (ARL-28), ex-LST-1118
 USS Amphitrite (ARL-29), ex-LST-1124
 USS Askari (ARL-30), ex-LST-1131
 USS Bellerophon (ARL-31), ex-LST-1132
 USS Bellona (ARL-32), ex-LST-1136
 USS Chimaera (ARL-33), ex-LST-1137
 USS ARL-34, canceled
 USS Daedalus (ARL-35), ex-LST-1143
 USS Gordius (ARL-36), ex-LST-1145
 USS Indra (ARL-37), ex-LST-1147
 USS Krishna (ARL-38), ex-LST-1149
 USS Quirinus (ARL-39), ex-LST-1151
 USS Remus (ARL-40), ex-LST-453
 USS Achilles (ARL-41), ex-LST-455
 USS Aeolus (ARL-42), conversion from LST-310 cancelled
 USS Cerberus (ARL-43), conversion from LST-316, cancelled
 USS Conus (ARL-44), conversion from LST-317 cancelled
 USS Feronia (ARL-45), conversion from LST-332 cancelled
 USS Chandra (ARL-46), conversion from LST-350 cancelled
 USS Minerva (ARL-47), conversion from LST-374 cancelled

Rescue and Salvage Ships (ARS)

Lapwing-class

 USS Viking (ARS-1), ex-AM-32
 USS Crusader (ARS-2), ex-AM-29
 USS Discoverer (ARS-3), ex-AM-38
 USS Redwing (ARS-4), ex-AM-48, sunk from an underwater explosion off Bizerte, North Africa 29 June 1943
 USS Warbler (ARS-11), ex-AM-53
 USS Willet (ARS-12), ex-AM-54
 USS Brant (ARS-32), ex-AM-24

Diver-class

 USS Diver (ARS-5)
 USS Escape (ARS-6)
 USS Grapple (ARS-7)
 USS Preserver (ARS-8)
 USS Shackle (ARS-9)
 USS Protector (ARS-14)
 USS Cable (ARS-19)
 USS Chain (ARS-20), later T-AGOR-17
 USS Curb (ARS-21)
 USS Current (ARS-22)
 USS Deliver (ARS-23)
 USS Grasp (ARS-24)
 USS Safeguard (ARS-25)
 USS Seize (ARS-26)
 USS Snatch (ARS-27), later T-AGOR-18
 USS Valve (ARS-28)
 USS Vent (ARS-29)
 USS Clamp (ARS-33)
 USS Gear (ARS-34)

Unknown class
 USS Assistance (ARS-10), not commissioned

Anchor-class

 USS Anchor (ARS-13)
 USS Extractor (ARS-15)
 USS Extricate (ARS-16), wrecked by Typhoon Louise Okinawa October 1945
 USS Restorer (ARS-17)
 USS Rescuer (ARS-18)

Ex-commercial vessels

 USS Accelerate (ARS-30)
 USS Harjurand (ARS-31)

Weight-class

 USS Weight (ARS-35)
 USS Swivel (ARS-36)

Tackle-class
 USS Tackle (ARS-37), later ARST-4

Bolster-class

 USS Bolster (ARS-38)
 USS Conserver (ARS-39)
 USS Hoist (ARS-40)
 USS Opportune (ARS-41)
 USS Reclaimer (ARS-42)
 USS Recovery (ARS-43)
 USS Retriever (ARS-44), canceled 1945
 USS Skillful (ARS-45), canceled 1945
 USS Support (ARS-46), canceled 1945
 USS Toiler (ARS-47), canceled 1945
 USS Urgent (ARS-48), canceled 1945
 USS Willing (ARS-49), canceled 1945

Safeguard-class

 USS Safeguard (ARS-50) [I]
 USS Grasp (ARS-51) [A]
 USS Salvor (ARS-52) [A]
 USS Grapple (ARS-53) [I]
 ARS-54, canceled

Salvage Lifting Vessels (ARSD)

 USS Gypsy (ARS(D)-1), ex-LSM-549
 USS Mender (ARS(D)-2), ex-LSM-550
 USS Salvager (ARS(D)-3), ex-LSM-551, later YMLC-3
 USS Windlass (ARS(D)-4), ex-LSM-552, later YMLC-4

Salvage Craft Tenders (ARST)

 USS Laysan Island (ARST-1), ex-LST-1098
 USS Okala (ARST-2), ex-LST-1099
 USS Palmyra (ARST-3), ex-LST-1100
 USS Tackle (ARST-4), ex-ARS-37, later IX-217

Aircraft Repair Ships (ARV, ARV(E), ARV(A))
Chourre-class
 USS Chourre (ARV-1) ex-ARG-14
 USS Webster (ARV-2) ex-ARG-15

Aventinus-class
 USS Aventinus (ARV(E)-3), ex-LST-1092
 USS Chloris (ARV(E)-4), ex-LST-1094

Fabius-class
 USS Fabius (ARV(A)-5), ex-LST-1093
 USS Megara (ARV(A)-6), ex-LST-1095

Helicopter Aircraft Repair Ships (ARVH)
 USNS Corpus Christi Bay (T-ARVH-1), ex-AV-5

Submarine Tenders (AS)

Ships which have functioned as submarine tenders without the AS designation include the USS Tallahassee (M-9).

 USS Fulton (AS-1), later PG-49
 USS Bushnell (AS-2), later AG-32, AGS-5
 USS Holland (AS-3), later ARG-18
 USS Alert (AS-4)
 USS Beaver (AS-5), ex-ID-2302, later ARG-19
 USS Camden (AS-6), ex-ID-3143, later IX-42
 USS Rainbow (AS-7)
 USS Savannah (AS-8), ex-ID-3015
 USS Canopus (AS-9), scuttled Manila Bay 9 April 1942
 USS Argonne (AS-10), ex-AP-4, later AG-31

Fulton-class

 USS Fulton (AS-11)
 USS Sperry (AS-12)
 USS Bushnell (AS-15)
 USS Howard W. Gilmore (AS-16)
 USS Nereus (AS-17)
 USS Orion (AS-18)
 USS Proteus (AS-19)

Griffin-class

 USS Griffin (AS-13)
 USS Pelias (AS-14)

Ex-commercial ships

 USS Otus (AS-20), later ARG-20
 USS Antaeus (AS-21), later AG-67, AH-18
 USS Euryale (AS-22)

Aegir-class

 USS Aegir (AS-23)
 USS Anthedon (AS-24)
 USS Apollo (AS-25)
 USS Clytie (AS-26)

Uncertain class

 USS Canopus (AS-27), canceled, later AD-33
 USS New England (AS-28), canceled, later AD-32
 (AS-29) and (AS-30) cancelled

Hunley-class

 USS Hunley (AS-31)
 USS Holland (AS-32)

Simon Lake-class

 USS Simon Lake (AS-33)
 USS Canopus (AS-34)
 (AS-35) cancelled

L. Y. Spear-class

 USS L. Y. Spear (AS-36)
 USS Dixon (AS-37)
 (AS-38) cancelled

Emory S. Land-class

 USS Emory S. Land (AS-39) [A]
 USS Frank Cable (AS-40) [A]
 USS McKee (AS-41) [I]

Submarine Rescue Vessels (ASR)

Lapwing-class

 USS Widgeon (ASR-1), ex-AM-22
 USS Falcon (ASR-2), ex-AM-28
 USS Chewink (ASR-3), ex-AM-39
 USS Mallard (ASR-4), ex-AM-44
 USS Ortolan (ASR-5), ex-AM-45
 USS Pigeon (ASR-6), ex-AM-47, sunk in air attack, Manila Bay, PI, 4 May 1942

Chanticleer-class

 USS Chanticleer (ASR-7)
 USS Coucal (ASR-8)
 USS Florikan (ASR-9)
 USS Greenlet (ASR-10)
 USS Macaw (ASR-11)
 USS Kittiwake (ASR-13)
 USS Petrel (ASR-14)
 USS Sunbird (ASR-15)
 USS Tringa (ASR-16)
 USS Verdin (ASR-17), canceled 12 August 1945
 USS Windhover (ASR-18), canceled 12 August 1945

Penguin-class

 USS Penguin (ASR-12)
 USS Bluebird (ASR-19)
 USS Skylark (ASR-20)

Pigeon-class

 USS Pigeon (ASR-21)
 USS Ortolan (ASR-22)

Cargo Transport Submarines (ASSA)

Fleet Tugs (AT)

 USS Patapsco (AT-10)
 USS Patuxent (AT-11)
 USS Wando (AT-17), later YT-123
 USS Chemung (AT-18), later YT-124
 USS Allegheny (AT-19)
 AT-40 to AT-45 – Canceled 1918
 USS Iroquois (AT-46)
 USS Osceola (AT-47)
 USS Peoria (AT-48)
 USS Piscataqua (AT-49)
 USS Potomac (AT-50)
 USS Uncas (AT-51), later YT-110
 USS Navajo (AT-52), later IX-56
 USS AT-53
 USS Conestoga (AT-54), ex-SP-1128, disappeared June 1921, 56 killed
 USS Genesee (AT-55), ex-SP-1116, scuttled 5 May 1942 at Corregidor
 USS Lykens (AT-56), ex-SP-876
 USS Sea Rover (AT-57), ex-SP-1014
 USS Undaunted (AT-58)
 USS Challenge (AT-59), ex-SP-1015, later YT-126, YTM-126
 USS Bay Spring (AT-60)
 USS Cahokia (AT-61)
 USS Tamaroa (AT-62), later YT-136
 USS Acushnet (AT-63)
 USS Tuscarora (AT-77)
 USS Carib (AT-78)
 USS Yuma (AT-79)
 USS Yaqui (AT-80)
 USS AT-119
 USS AT-120
 USS Maricopa (AT-146)
 USS Esselen (AT-147)
 USS Chetco (AT-166)
 USS Chatot (AT-167)

Sonoma-class
 USS Sonoma (AT-12)
 USS Ontario (AT-13)

Arapaho-class

 USS Arapaho (AT-14)
 USS Mohave (AT-15), wrecked 13 February 1928, 3 killed
 USS Tillamook (AT-16)

Bagaduce-class

 USS Sagamore (AT-20)
 USS Bagaduce (AT-21)
 USS Tadousac (AT-22)
 USS Kalmia (AT-23)
 USS Kewaydin (AT-24)
 USS Umpqua (AT-25)
 USS Wandank (AT-26)
 USS Tatnuck (AT-27)
 USS Sunnadin (AT-28)
 USS Mahopac (AT-29)
 USS Sciota (AT-30)
 USS Koka (AT-31), grounded 7 December 1937
 USS Napa (AT-32), scuttled to avoid capture 8 April 1942
 USS Pinola (AT-33)
 USS Algorma (AT-34)
 USS Carrabasset (AT-35)
 USS Contocook (AT-36)
 USS Iuka (AT-37)
 USS Keosanqua (AT-38)
 USS Montcalm (AT-39)

Cherokee-class

 USS Navajo (AT-64), sunk by torpedo 12 September 1943, 17 killed
 USS Seminole (AT-65), sunk by naval gunfire Tulagi 25 October 1942, 1 killed
 USS Cherokee (AT-66)
 USS Apache (AT-67)
 USS Arapaho (AT-68)
 USS Chippewa (AT-69)
 USS Choctaw (AT-70)
 USS Hopi (AT-71)
 USS Kiowa (AT-72)
 USS Menominee (AT-73)
 USS Pawnee (AT-74)
 USS Sioux (AT-75)
 USS Ute (AT-76)
 USS Bannock (AT-81)
 USS Carib (AT-82)
 USS Chickasaw (AT-83)
 USS Cree (AT-84)
 USS Lipan (AT-85)
 USS Mataco (AT-86)
 USS Moreno (AT-87)
 USS Narragansett (AT-88)
 USS Nauset (AT-89)
 USS Pinto (AT-90)
 USS Seneca (AT-91)
 USS Tawasa (AT-92)
 USS Tekesta (AT-93)
 USS Yuma (AT-94)
 USS Zuni (AT-95)
 USS Chilula (AT-153)

Abnaki-class

 USS Abnaki (AT-96)
 USS Alsea (AT-97)
 USS Arikara (AT-98)
 USS Chetco (AT-99)
 USS Chowanoc (AT-100)
 USS Cocopa (AT-101)
 USS Hidatsa (AT-102)
 USS Hitchiti (AT-103)
 USS Jicarilla (AT-104)
 USS Moctobi (AT-105)
 USS Molala (AT-106)
 USS Munsee (AT-107)
 USS Pakana (AT-108)
 USS Potawatomi (AT-109)
 USS Quapaw (AT-110)
 USS Sarsi (AT-111)
 USS Seranno (AT-112)
 USS Takelma (AT-113)
 USS Tawakoni (AT-114)
 USS Tenino (AT-115)
 USS Tolowa (AT-116)
 USS Wateree (AT-117)
 USS Wenatchee (AT-118)
 USS Achomawi (AT-148)
 USS Atakapa (AT-149)
 USS Avoyel (AT-150)
 USS Chawasha (AT-151)
 USS Cahuilla (AT-152)
 USS Chimariko (AT-154)
 USS Cusabo (AT-155)
 USS Luiseno (AT-156)
 USS Nipmuc (AT-157)
 USS Mosopelea (AT-158)
 USS Paiute (AT-159)
 USS Papago (AT-160)
 USS Salinan (AT-161)
 USS Shakori (AT-162)
 USS Utina (AT-163)
 USS Yurok (AT-164)
 USS Yustaga (AT-165)

Sotoyomo-class

 USS AT-121
 USS AT-122
 USS AT-123
 USS AT-124
 USS AT-125
 USS AT-126
 USS AT-127
 USS AT-128
 USS AT-129
 USS AT-130

Lapwing-class

 USS Bobolink (AT-131), ex-AM-20
 USS Brant (AT-132), ex-AM-24, later ARS-32
 USS Cormorant (AT-133), ex-AM-40
 USS Grebe (AT-134), ex-AM-43
 USS Kingfisher (AT-135), ex-AM-25
 USS Oriole (AT-136), ex-AM-7
 USS Owl (AT-137), ex-AM-2
 USS Partridge (AT-138), ex-AM-16
 USS Rail (AT-139), ex-AM-26
 USS Robin (AT-140), ex-AM-3
 USS Seagull (AT-141), ex-AM-30
 USS Tern (AT-142), ex-AM-31
 USS Turkey (AT-143), ex-AM-13
 USS Vireo (AT-144), ex-AM-52
 USS Woodcock (AT-145), ex-AM-14
 USS Lark (AT-168), ex-AM-21
 USS Whippoorwill (AT-169), ex-AM-35

Auxiliary Ocean Tugs (ATA, T-ATA)
The first ten boats of the Sotoyomo-class were originally classed as Fleet Tugs (AT), as were ATA-146, ATA-166, and ATA-167.

Sotoyomo-class

 USS Sotoyomo (ATA-121)
 USS ATA-122
 USS Iuka (ATA-123)
 USS ATA-124
 USS ATA-125
 USS ATA-126
 USS ATA-127
 USS ATA-128
 USS ATA-170
 USS ATA-171
 USS ATA-172
 USS ATA-173
 USS Wateree (ATA-174)/(1)|USNS Wateree (T-ATA-174|1))
 USS Sonoma (ATA-175)
 USS Tonkawa (ATA-176)/(1)|USNS Tonkawa (T-ATA-176|1))
 USS ATA-177
 USS Tunica (ATA-178)
 USS Allegheny (ATA-179)
 USS ATA-180
 USS Accokeek (ATA-181)
 USS Unadilla (ATA-182)
 USS Nottoway (ATA-183)
 USS Kalmia (ATA-184)
 USS Koka (ATA-185)
 USS Cahokia (ATA-186)
 USS Salish (ATA-187)
 USS Penobscot (ATA-188)
 USS Reindeer (ATA-189)
 USS Samoset (ATA-190)
 USS ATA-191
 USS Tillamook (ATA-192)
 USS Stallion (ATA-193)
 USS Bagaduce (ATA-194)
 USS Tatnuck (ATA-195)
 USS Mahopac (ATA-196)
 USS Sunnadin (ATA-197)
 USS Keosanqua (ATA-198)
 USS Undaunted (ATA-199)
 USS ATA-200
 USS Challenge (ATA-201)
 USS Wampanoag (ATA-202)
 USS Navigator (ATA-203)
 USS Wandank (ATA-204)
 USS Sciota (ATA-205)
 USS Pinola (ATA-206)
 USS Geronimo (ATA-207)
 USS Sagamore (ATA-208)
 USS Umpqua (ATA-209)
 USS Catawba (ATA-210)
 USS Navajo (ATA-211)
 USS Algorma (ATA-212)
 USS Keywadin (ATA-213)

ATA-214-class

 USS ATA-214, ex-YN-94/AN-70
 USS ATA-215, ex-YN-95/AN-71
 USS ATA-216, ex-YN-96/AN-72
 USS ATA-217
 USS ATA-218

Other classes

 USS Maricopa (ATA-146)
 USS Chetco (ATA-166)
 USS Chatot (ATA-167)
 USS ATA-219
 USS ATA-220
 USS ATA-221
 USS ATA-222
 USS ATA-223
 USS ATA-224
 USS ATA-225
 USS ATA-226
 USS ATA-227
 USS ATA-228
 USS ATA-229
 USS ATA-230
 ATA-231 to ATA-233 – Cancelled 1945-1947
 USS ATA-234
 USS ATA-235
 USS ATA-236
 USS ATA-237
 USS ATA-238
 USNS T-ATA-239
 USNS T-ATA-240
 USNS T-ATA-241
 USNS T-ATA-242
 USNS T-ATA-243
 USNS T-ATA-244
 USS Tuscarora (ATA-245)

Fleet Ocean Tugs (ATF, T-ATF)
All tugs of the Cherokee and Abnaki classes were reclassed from Fleet Tugs (AT) on 15 May 1944.

Cherokee-class

 USS Cherokee (ATF-66)
 USS Apache (ATF-67)
 USS Arapaho (ATF-68)
 USS Chippewa (ATF-69)
 USS Choctaw (ATF-70)
 USS Hopi (ATF-71)
 USS Kiowa (ATF-72)
 USS Menominee (ATF-73)
 USS Pawnee (ATF-74)
 USS Sioux (ATF-75)
 USS Ute (ATF-76)
 USS Bannock (ATF-81)
 USS Carib (ATF-82)
 USS Chickasaw (ATF-83)
 USS Cree (ATF-84)
 USS Lipan (ATF-85)
 USS Mataco (ATF-86)
 USS Moreno (ATF-87)
 USS Narragansett (ATF-88)
 USS Nauset (ATF-89)
 USS Pinto (ATF-90)
 USS Seneca (ATF-91)
 USS Tawasa (ATF-92)
 USS Tekesta (ATF-93)
 USS Yuma (ATF-94)
 USS Zuni (ATF-95)
 USS Chilula (AT-153)

Abnaki-class

 USS Abnaki (ATF-96)
 USS Alsea (ATF-97)
 USS Arikara (ATF-98)
 USS Chetco (ATF-99), later ASR-12
 USS Chowanoc (ATF-100)
 USS Cocopa (ATF-101)
 USS Hidatsa (ATF-102)
 USS Hitchiti (ATF-103)
 USS Jicarilla (ATF-104)
 USS Moctobi (ATF-105)
 USS Molala (ATF-106)
 USS Munsee (ATF-107)
 USS Pakana (ATF-108)
 USS Potawatomi (ATF-109)
 USS Quapaw (ATF-110)
 USS Sarsi (ATF-111), sunk by mine between Hungnam and Wonsan, Korea, 27 August 1952, 4 killed
 USS Seranno (ATF-112)
 USS Takelma (ATF-113)
 USS Tawakoni (ATF-114)
 USS Tenino (ATF-115)
 USS Tolowa (ATF-116)
 USS Wateree (ATF-117), wrecked by Typhoon Louise Okinawa October 1945, 8 killed
 USS Wenatchee (ATF-118)
 USS Achomawi (ATF-148)
 USS Atakapa (ATF-149)
 USS Avoyel (ATF-150)
 USS Chawasha (ATF-151)
 USS Cahuilla (ATF-152)
 USS Chimariko (ATF-154)
 USS Cusabo (ATF-155)
 USS Luiseno (ATF-156)
 USS Nipmuc (ATF-157)
 USS Mosopelea (ATF-158)
 USS Paiute (ATF-159)
 USS Papago (ATF-160)
 USS Salinan (ATF-161)
 USS Shakori (ATF-162)
 USS Utina (ATF-163)
 USS Yurok (ATF-164)
 USS Yustaga (ATF-165)

Powhatan-class

 USNS Powhatan (T-ATF-166)
 USNS Narragansett (T-ATF-167)
 USNS Catawba (T-ATF-168) [A]
 USNS Navajo (T-ATF-169) [I]
 USNS Mohawk (T-ATF-170) [I]
 USNS Sioux (T-ATF-171) [I]
 USNS Apache (T-ATF-172) [I]

Fleet Tugs, Old (ATO)
The Fleet Tug Old classification was created on 15 May 1944, several Fleet Tugs received this classification at this time without a change of hull number.

 USS Allegheny (ATO-19)
 USS Undaunted (ATO-58)
 USS Acushnet (ATO-63)
 USS Esselin (ATO-147)

Sonoma-class
 USS Sonoma (ATO-12), sunk by kamikaze San Pedro Bay, Leyte Gulf, Philippines, 24 October 1944
 USS Ontario (ATO-13)

Bagaduce-class

 USS Sagamore (AT-20)
 USS Bagaduce (ATO-21)
 USS Kalmia (ATO-23)
 USS Kewaydin (ATO-24)
 USS Umpqua (ATO-25)
 USS Wandank (ATO-26)
 USS Tatnuck (ATO-27)
 USS Sunnadin (ATO-28)
 USS Mahopac (ATO-29)
 USS Sciota (ATO-30)
 USS Pinola (ATO-33)
 USS Algorma (ATO-34)
 USS Iuka (ATO-37)
 USS Keosanqua (ATO-38)
 USS Montcalm (ATO-39)

Lapwing-class

 USS Bobolink (ATO-131)
 USS Cormorant (ATO-133)
 USS Kingfisher (ATO-135)
 USS Oriole (ATO-136)
 USS Owl (ATO-137)
 USS Partridge (ATO-138), sunk by torpedo off Normandy, France, 11 June 1944, 5 killed
 USS Rail (ATO-139)
 USS Robin (ATO-140)
 USS Seagull (ATO-141)
 USS Tern (ATO-142)
 USS Turkey (ATO-143)
 USS Vireo (ATO-144)
 USS Woodcock (ATO-145)
 USS Lark (ATO-168)
 USS Whippoorwill (ATO-169)

Rescue Tugs (ATR)
ART-1 class

 USS ATR-1
 USS ATR-2
 USS ATR-3
 USS ATR-4
 USS ATR-5
 USS ATR-6
 USS ATR-7
 USS ATR-8
 USS ATR-9
 USS ATR-10
 USS ATR-11
 USS ATR-12
 USS ATR-13
 USS ATR-14
 USS ATR-15
 USS ATR-16
 USS ATR-17
 USS ATR-18
 USS ATR-19
 USS ATR-20
 USS ATR-21
 USS ATR-22
 USS ATR-23
 USS ATR-24
 USS ATR-25
 USS ATR-26
 USS ATR-27
 USS ATR-28
 USS ATR-29
 USS ATR-30
 USS ATR-31
 USS ATR-32
 USS ATR-33
 USS ATR-34
 USS ATR-35
 USS ATR-36
 USS ATR-37
 USS ATR-38
 USS ATR-39
 USS ATR-40
 USS ATR-41
 USS ATR-42

Sotoyomo-class

 USS ATR-43
 USS ATR-44
 USS ATR-45
 USS ATR-46
 USS ATR-47
 USS ATR-51
 USS ATR-52
 USS ATR-53
 USS ATR-54
 USS ATR-55
 USS ATR-56
 USS ATR-57
 USS ATR-58
 USS ATR-59
 USS ATR-60
 USS ATR-61
 USS ATR-62
 USS ATR-63
 USS ATR-64
 USS ATR-65
 USS ATR-66
 USS ATR-67
 USS ATR-68
 USS ATR-69
 USS ATR-70
 USS ATR-71
 USS ATR-72
 USS ATR-73
 USS ATR-74
 USS ATR-75
 USS ATR-76
 USS ATR-77
 USS ATR-78
 USS ATR-79
 USS ATR-80
 USS ATR-81
 USS ATR-82
 USS ATR-83
 USS ATR-84
 USS ATR-85
 USS ATR-86
 USS ATR-87
 USS ATR-88
 USS ATR-89
 USS ATR-90
 USS ATR-91
 USS ATR-92
 USS ATR-93
 USS ATR-94
 USS ATR-95
 USS ATR-96
 USS ATR-97
 USS ATR-98
 USS ATR-99
 USS ATR-100
 USS ATR-101
 USS ATR-102
 USS ATR-103
 USS ATR-104
 USS ATR-105
 USS ATR-106
 USS ATR-107
 USS ATR-108
 USS ATR-109
 USS ATR-110
 USS ATR-111
 USS ATR-112
 USS ATR-113
 USS ATR-114
 USS ATR-115
 USS ATR-116
 USS ATR-117
 USS ATR-118
 USS ATR-119
 USS ATR-120
 USS ATR-121
 USS ATR-122
 USS ATR-123
 USS ATR-124
 USS ATR-125
 USS ATR-126
 USS ATR-127
 USS ATR-128
 USS ATR-129
 USS ATR-130
 USS ATR-131
 USS ATR-132
 USS ATR-133
 USS ATR-134
 USS ATR-135
 USS ATR-136
 USS ATR-137
 USS ATR-138
 USS ATR-139
 USS ATR-140

Salvage and Rescue Ships (ATS)
Edenton-class
 USS Edenton (ATS-1), later USCGC Alex Haley (WMEC-39).
 USS Beaufort (ATS-2)
 USS Brunswick (ATS-3)

ATS-4 and ATS-5 skipped

Navajo-class
 USNS Navajo (T-ATS-6) [P]
 USNS Cherokee Nation (T-ATS-7) [P]
 USNS Saginaw Ojibwe Anishinabek (T-ATS-8) [P]
 USNS Lenni Lenape (T-ATS-7) [P]
 USNS Muscogee Creek Nation (T-ATS-10) [P]
 (T-ATS-11) [P]
 (T-ATS-12) [P]

Seaplane Tenders (AV)

Ships which have functioned as seaplane tenders without the AV designation include the USS Mississippi (BB-23) in 1914, the USS Ajax (AG-15) in 1924-1925, and the USS Christiana (IX-80 / YAG-32) in WW2.

Wright-class
 USS Wright (AV-1), ex-AZ-1, later AG-79

Jason-class
 USS Jason (AV-2), ex-AC-12

Langley-class
 USS Langley (AV-3), ex-AC-3, CV-1, scuttled Java Sea 27 February 1942 after air attack, 16 killed outright, possibly hundreds killed after rescue ship sunk

Curtiss-class
 USS Curtiss (AV-4)
 USS Albemarle (AV-5), later T-ARVH-1

Patoka-class
 USS Patoka (AV-6), ex-AO–9, later AG–125

Currituck class
 USS Currituck (AV-7)
 USS Norton Sound (AV-11), later AVM-1
 USS Pine Island (AV-12)
 USS Salisbury Sound (AV-13)

Tangier-class
 USS Tangier (AV-8)
 USS Hobe Sound (AV-20), canceled while under construction 1944

Pocomoke-class
 USS Pocomoke (AV-9)

Chandeleur-class
 USS Chandeleur (AV-10)

Kenneth Whiting-class
 USS Kenneth Whiting (AV-14)
 USS Hamlin (AV-15) 
 USS St George (AV-16)
 USS Cumberland Sound (AV-17) 
 USS Townsend (AV-18), cancelled while under construction 1945

unknown class
 USS Calibogue (AV-19), canceled while under construction 1944
 (AV-22), conversion from unassigned ship canceled
 (AV-23), conversion from unassigned ship canceled

Ashland-class
 USS Ashland (AV-21), conversion from LSD-1 canceled 1959

Advance Aviation Base Ships (AVB, T-AVB)

 USS Alameda County (AVB-1), ex-LST-32
 USS Tallahatchie County (AVB-2), ex-LST-1154
  [A]
 USNS Curtiss (T-AVB-4) [A]

Seaplane Catapult, Light (AVC)
 AVC-1

Destroyer Seaplane Tenders (AVD)
Clemson-class
 , former AVP-14
 , former AVP-15, later APD-27
 , former AVP-16, later APD-33
 , former AVP-17, later APD-31
 , former AVP-18, later APD-32
 , former AVP-19
 , former AVP-20
 , former DD-251, later APD-34
 , former DD-255, later APD-35
 , former DD-267
 , former DD-270
 , former DD-260
 USS Greene (AVD-13), former DD-266, later APD-36
 , former DD-237

Auxiliary aircraft escort vessels (AVG)

The Auxiliary aircraft escort vessels (AVG) were redesignated Auxiliary aircraft carriers (ACV) and then Escort aircraft carriers (CVE).

Guided Missile Ships (AVM)
 USS Norton Sound (AVM-1), ex-AV-11

Small Seaplane Tenders (AVP)
Lapwing-class
 USS Lapwing (AVP-1), former AM-1
 USS Heron (AVP-2), former AM-10
 USS Thrush (AVP-3), former AM-18
 USS Avocet (AVP-4), former AM-19
 USS Teal (AVP-5), former AM-23
 USS Pelican (AVP-6) , former AM-27
 USS Swan (AVP-7), former AM-34
 USS Gannet (AVP-8), former AM-41
 USS Sandpiper (AVP-9), former AM-51

Clemson-class
 USS Childs (AVP-14), former DD-241, later AVD-1
 USS Williamson (AVP-15), former DD-244, later AVD-2
 USS George E. Badger (AVP-16), former DD-196, CG-16 (USCG), later AVD-3
 USS Clemson (AVP-17), former DD-186, later AVD-4
 USS Goldsborough (AVP-18), former DD-188, later AVD-5
 USS Hulbert (AVP-19), former DD-342, later AVD-6
 USS William B. Preston (AVP-20), former DD-344, later AVD-7

Barnegat-class
 USS Barnegat (AVP-10)
 USS Biscayne (AVP-11), later AGC-18
 USS Casco (AVP-12)
 USS Mackinac (AVP-13)
 USS Hunboldt (AVP-21), briefly AG-121
 USS Matagorda (AVP-22), briefly AG-122
 USS Abescon (AVP-23)
 USS Chincoteague (AVP-24)
 USS Coos Bay (AVP-25)
 USS Half Moon (AVP-26)
 USS Mobjack (AVP-27), later AGP-7
 USS Oyster Bay (AVP-28), briefly AGP-6
 USS Rockaway (AVP-29), briefly AG-123
 USS San Pablo (AVP-30), later AGS-30
 USS Unimak (AVP-31)
 USS Yakutat (AVP-32)
 USS Barataria (AVP-33)
 USS Bering Strait (AVP-34)
 USS Castle Rock (AVP-35)
 USS Cook Inlet (AVP-36)
 USS Corson (AVP-37)
 USS Duxbury Bay (AVP-38)
 USS Gardiners Bay (AVP-39)
 USS Floyds Bay (AVP-40)
 USS Greenwich Bay (AVP-41)
 USS Hatteras (AVP-42), canceled
 USS Hempstead (AVP-43), canceled
 USS Kamishak (AVP-44), canceled
 USS Magothy (AVP-45), canceled
 USS Matanzas (AVP-46), canceled
 USS Metomkin (AVP-47), canceled
 USS Onslow (AVP-48)
 USS Orca (AVP-49)
 USS Rehoboth (AVP-50), later AGS-50
 USS San Carlos (AVP-51), later T-AGOR-1
 USS Shelikof (AVP-52)
 USS Suisin (AVP-53)
 USS Timbalier (AVP-54)
 USS Valcour (AVP-55), later AGF-1
 USS Wachapreague (AVP-56), later AGP-8
 USS Willoughby (AVP-57), later AGP-9

Aviation Stores Issue Ships (AVS)

 USS Supply (AVS-1), ex-IX-147
 USS Fortune (AVS-2), ex-IX-146
 USS Grumium (AVS-3), ex-AK-112, ex-IX-174
 USS Allioth (AVS-4), ex-AK-109, ex-IX-204
 USS Gwinnett (AVS-5), ex-AK-185, ex-AG-92
 USS Nicollet (AVS-6), ex-AK-199, ex-AG-93
 USS Pontotoc (AVS-7), ex-AK-206, ex-AG-94
 USS Jupiter (AVS-8), ex-AK-43

Aircraft Transports (AVT)

 USS Cowpens (AVT-1), ex-CVL-25
 USS Monterey (AVT-2), ex-CVL-26
 USS Cabot (AVT-3), ex-CVL-28
 USS Bataan (AVT-4), ex-CVL-29
 USS San Jacinto (AVT-5), ex-CVL-30
 USS Saipan (AVT-6), ex-CVL-48, later CC-3, AGMR-2
 USS Wright (AVT-7), ex-CVL-49, later CC-2
 USS Franklin (AVT-8), ex-CV-13
 USS Bunker Hill (AVT-9), ex-CV-17
 USS Leyte (AVT-10), ex-CV-32
 USS Philippine Sea (AVT-11), ex-CV-47
 USS Tarawa (AVT-12), ex-CV-40

Auxiliary Aircraft Landing Training Ships (AVT)

 USS Lexington (AVT-16), ex CVT-16
 USS Forrestal (AVT-59), ex CVA-59

Distilling Ships (AW)

Stag-class

 USS Stag (AW-1), ex-IX-128
 USS Wildcat (AW-2), ex-IX-130

Pasig-class

 USS Pasig (AW-3), ex-AO–91
 USS Abatan (AW-4), ex-AO–92

Lighter-than-Air Aircraft Tender (AZ)
 USS Wright (AZ-1), later AV-1
 USS Patoka (AO-9) operated as a lighter-than-air aircraft tender from 1924 to 1933, but never received the AZ classification

Miscellaneous Classifications (IX)

Yard and District Craft (Y)

Pre-1920 craft

Screw Tugs

World War I (ID) series
Civilian cargo ships, tankers, transports, etc., were registered during World War I for potential use and given "ID" identification numbers in the "ID/SP" numbering series.

See also
 Auxiliary cruiser (which is, despite its name, a type of warship (cruiser), not an auxiliary)
 Glossary of watercraft types in service of the United States
 List of current ships of the United States Navy
 
 List of United States Naval Air Stations, including auxiliary airfields
 Military Auxiliary Radio System, Navy-Marine Corp branch operated 1962-2015
 Military Sealift Command, current operator of most US Navy auxiliaries
 Type B ship - United States Maritime Commission barge designs
 Type V ship - United States Maritime Commission tugboat designs
 United States Coast Guard Auxiliary (an auxiliary organization of support personnel, not a type of ship)

References

Citations

Sources

External links 
Museum ships
 USNS Carthage (T-AG-185) / SS American Victory, American Victory Ship & Museum, Tampa, FL
 USS Cahuilla (ATF-152), San Pedro, Buenos Aires Province, Argentina
 USS Potomac (AG-25) - Association for the Preservation of the Presidential Yacht Potomac, Oakland, CA
 USS Pueblo (AGER-2), Pyongyang, North Korea
 USS Wampanoag (ATA-202) - ATA-202 Foundation, Tacoma, WA

United States Navy
 
Auxiliaries
Auxiliaries list